= List of Orientalist artists =

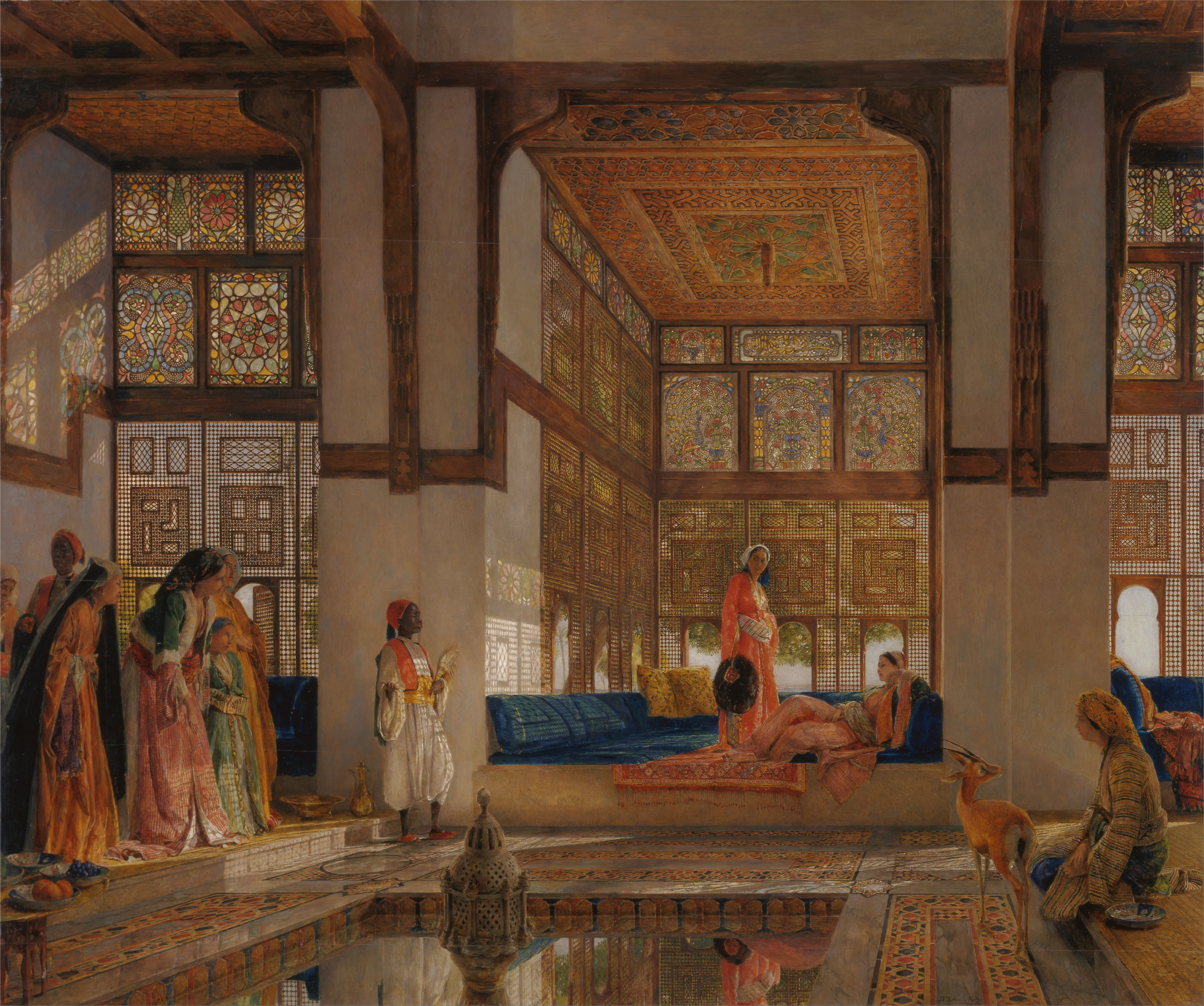
John Frederick Lewis, The Reception, 1873

This is an incomplete list of artists who have produced works on Orientalist subjects, drawn from the Islamic world or other parts of Asia. Many artists listed on this page worked in many genres, and Orientalist subjects may not have formed a major part of their body of work. For example, the list includes some portrait painters based in Europe who on occasion painted sitters wearing "oriental" costume. The list also includes Orientalist photographers, engravers and lithographers. The list includes links to the English Wikipedia, and where no English article exists, named artists are linked to foreign language versions of Wikipedia, where available.

Note: This listing uses Spanish naming customs, for personalities from cultural areas where they prevail : the first family name is the paternal name and the second is the maternal family name. Artists are listed alphabetically by their paternal family name. For example, the Spanish artist, Joaquín Sorolla y Bastida, is listed under "S" for Sorolla, the paternal family name.

Colombari Colombo

- Luigi Acquarone (Italian, 1800–1896)
- Maurice Adrey (French, 1899–1950)
- Edouard Joseph Alexander Agneessens (Belgian, 1842–1885)
- Simon Agopyan (also known as Simon Hagopian) (Armenian, 1857–1921)
- Christoph Ludwig Agricola (German, 1667–1719)
- Ivan Konstantinovich Aivazovsky (Russia, 1817–1900)
- Tadeusz Ajdukiewicz (Polish, 1852–1916)
- José Alcázar Tejedor (Spanish, 1850–1907)
- George Aleef (Russian, 1887–1970)
- William Allan (Scottish, 1782–1850)
- Gaudensi Allar (French, 1841–1904) architect and sculptor
- Marguerite Allar (French, 1899–1974)
- Francesco Saverio Altamura (Italian, 1822–1897)
- Germán Álvarez Algeciras (Spanish, 1848–c.1912)
- Eugenio Álvarez Dumont (Spanish, 1864–1927)
- Rodolfo Amoedo (Brazilian, 1857–1941)
- Rafael von Ambros (Austrian, 1855–1895)
- Federico Amérigo y Rouvier (Cuban-Spanish, 1840–1912)
- Pierre Andrieu (French, 1821–1892)
- Luis Anglada Pinto (Spanish, 1873–1946)
- Louis Ferdinand Antoni (French, 1872–1940)
- German Aracil (Spanish, b. 1965)
- Charles Édouard Armand-Dumaresq (French, 1826–1895)
- Hippolyte Arnoux (French, fl.1860–1890) photographer, active in the Nile Valley
- José Arpa y Perea (Spanish, 1858–1952)
- Antonio Arraez (Spanish, 1829–1891)
- Josep Arrau i Barba (Spanish, 1802–1872)
- Kamil Aslanger (Turkish, b. 1949)
- Armand Assus (French, 1892–1977)
- Albert Louis Aublet (French, 1851–1938)
- Émile Aubry (French, 1880–1964)
- Giuseppe Aureli (Italian, 1858–1929)
- Adolphe Aze (French, 1823–1884)

== B ==
- Henry Bacon (American, 1839–1912)
- Émile Baes (Belgian, 1879-1953)
- Léon Bakst (Russian, 1866–1924)
- Ricardo Balaca y Orejas-Canseco (Spanish, 1844–1880)
- Francesco Ballesio (Italian, 1860–1923)
- Mariano Baquero (Spanish, 1838–c.1890)
- Mathieu Barathier (French, 1784–1867) lithographer and engraver
- Filippo Baratti (Italian, 1849–1936)
- Mariano Barbasán y Lagueruela (Spanish, 1864–1924)
- Jean Barbault (French, 1718–1762)
- Prosper Barbot (French, 1798–1877)
- Salvador Sánchez Barbudo (Spanish, 1857–1917)
- Charles Bargue (French, c. 1826/1827–1883)
- Josep Tapiró Baró (Spanish, 1836–1913)
- Alfonso Barrada y Medina (Spanish, 1857–1905)
- François Pierre Barry (French, 1813–1905)
- Federico Bartolini (Italian 1861–1908)
- Marius Bauer (Dutch, 1867–1932)
- Gustav Bauernfeind (German, 1848–1904)
- Frédéric Bazille (French, 1841–1870)
- Antonio Beato (Italian, 1835–1906) Orientalist photographer
- Felice Beato (Italian, 1832–1909) Orientalist photographer
- Émile Béchard (French, fl. 1870–1890) Orientalist photographer
- Mikhail Belaevsky (Russian, 1893–1930)
- Gentile Bellini (Italian, c.1429–1507)
- Pietro Bello (Italian, 1831–1909)
- Léon Belly (French, 1827–1877)
- Manuel Benedito (Spanish, 1875–1963)
- José Benlliure y Gil (Spanish, 1855–1937)
- Jean-Joseph Benjamin-Constant (French, 1845–1902)
- François-Léon Benouville (French, 1821–1859)
- Joseph Austin Benwell (British, 1816–1886)
- Narcisse Berchère (French, 1819–1891)
- Émile Bernard (French, 1868–1941)
- Louis Michel Bernard (French, 1885–1962)
- Mariano Bertuchi (Spanish, 1842–1955)
- Hippolyte Berteaux (French, 1843–1928)
- Antonio Berti (Italian, 1830–1912)
- Pierre-Marie Beyle (French, 1838–1902)
- Roger Bezombes (French, 1913–1994) painter, engraver and lithographer
- Alexandre Bida (French, 1813–1895)
- Anton "Tony" Binder (Austrian, 1868–1944) painter and photographer
- Gonzalo Bilbao (Spanish, 1860–1938)
- Cesare Biseo (Italian, 1843–1909)
- Maurice Bismouth (French, 1891–1965)
- Norbert Bitner (Austrian, 1786–1845)
- Edwin Howland Blashfield (American, 1848–1936)
- Alexandre Bloch (French, 1857–1919)
- Ludwig Blum (Israeli, 1891–1975)
- Viktor Alexeevich Bobrov (Russian, 1842–1918)
- Barbara Bodichon (French, 1827–1891)
- Pál Böhm (Hungarian, 1839–1905)
- Edmond Marie Félix de Boislecomte (French, 1849–1923)
- Maurice Boitel (French, 1919–2007)
- Maurice Bompard (French, 1857–1936)
- Félix Bonfils (French, 1831–1885) Orientalist photographer
- Richard Parkes Bonington (British, 1802–1828)
- Léon Joseph Florentin Bonnat (French, 1833–1922)
- Frédéric Borgella (French, 1833–1901)
- Auguste Borget (French, 1808–1877)
- Vladimir Borovikovsky (Russian, 1796–1825)
- Carlo Bossoli (Italian, 1815–1884)
- Paul Louis Bouchard (French, 1853–1937)
- Michel Bouchaud (French, 1902–1965)
- François Boucher (French, 1703–1770)
- Joseph-Félix Bouchor (French, 1853–1937)
- William-Adolphe Bouguereau (French, 1825–1905)
- Gustave Boulanger (French, 1824–1888)
- Lev Boure (Russian, 1877–1943)
- John Cooke Bourne (British, 1814–1896) Lithographer
- Bernard Boutet de Monvel (French, 1881–1949)
- Maurice Bouviolle (French, 1893–1971)
- Eugen Bracht (Swiss, 1842–1921)
- Carlo Brancaccio (Italian, 1861–1920)
- Sir Frank William Brangwyn (Anglo-Welsh, 1867–1956)
- Yves Brayer (French, 1907–1990)
- Émile Bréchot (French, 1887–1971)
- Ferdinand Max Bredt (German, 1860–1921)
- Germain Fabius Brest (French, 1823–1900)
- Anna Richards Brewster (American, 1870–1952)
- Frederick Arthur Bridgman (American, 1847–1928)
- Édouard Brindeau de Jarny (French, 1867–1943)
- Florence Broadhurst (Australian, 1899–1977)
- Walery Brochocki (Polish, 1847–1923)
- André Brouillet (French, 1857–1914)
- George Elmer Browne (American, 1871–1946)
- Henriette Browne (French, 1829–1901)
- Karl Pavlovitch Briullov (Russian, 1799–1852)
- Odette Bruneau (French, 1891–1984)
- Frank Buchser (Swiss, 1828–1890)
- Francisco Bushell Laussat (Spanish, 1836–1901)
- Marius de Buzon (French, 1879–1958)

== C ==
- Alexandre Cabanel (French, 1823–1889)
- Umberto Cacciarelli (Italian, 1880–c.1939)
- Christian Caillard (French, 1899–1985)
- Joaquin Capulino Jauregui (Spanish 1879–1969)
- Miguel Navarro Cañizares (Spanish, 1840–1913)
- Vittore Carpaccio (Italian, c.1465–1525/1526)
- Léon Carré (French, 1878–1942)
- José María Casado del Alisal (Spanish, 1830/32–1886)
- Francesco Giuseppe Casanova (Italian, 1727–1803)
- Manuel Castaño Guerrero (Spanish, 19th century)
- Léon Cauvy (French, 1874–1933)
- Eugenio Cecconi (Italian, 1842–1903)
- Felice Cerruti Beauduc (Italian, 1818–1896)
- Giacomo Antonio Melchiorre Ceruti (Italian, 1698–1767)
- James Wells Champney (American, 1843–1903)
- Eduard Charlemont (Austrian, 1848–1906)
- Théodore Chassériau (French, 1819–1856)
- Alfred Chataud (French, 1833–1908)
- Stanisław Chlebowski (Polish, 1835–1884)
- William Merritt Chase (American, 1849–1916)
- Ulpiano Checa (Spanish, 1860–1916) painter and sculptor
- Henri Chouanard (French, Oriental photographer 1883–1936)
- Frederic Edwin Church (American, 1826–1900)
- Ettore Cercone (Italian, 1850–1896)
- Richard Clague (American, 1821–1873)
- Georges Jules Victor Clairin (French, 1843–1919)
- Félix Auguste Clément (French, 1826–1888)
- Leon Cogniet (French, 1794–1880)
- Francesco Coleman (Italian, 1851–1918)
- John Maler Collier (British, 1850–1934)
- Samuel Colman (American, 1832–1920)
- Léon François Comerre (French, 1850–1916)
- Colin Campbell Cooper (American, 1856–1937)
- Ricardo Villegas y Cordero (Spanish, 1849–1896)
- Charles Henri Joseph Cordier (French, 1827–1905)
- Lovis Corinth (German, 1858–1925)
- Fernand Cormon (French, 1845–1924)
- Michele Felice Cornè (French-American, 1752–1845)
- George Corominas (Spanish, b. 1945)
- Jean-Baptiste Corot (French, 1796–1875)
- Hermann David Salomon Corrodi (Italian, 1844–1905)
- Michele Cortegiani (Italian, 1857–1928)
- Gustave Courbet (French, 1819–1877)
- Georges Croegaert (Belgian, 1848–1923)
- Andres Cuervo Herrero (Spanish, 1863–1933)

== D ==
- Henri Dabadie (French, 1867–1949)
- Richard Dadd (English, 1817–1886)
- Thomas Daniell (English, 1749–1840)
- Massimo d'Azeglio (Italian, 1798–1866)
- Charles-Edmond Daux (French, 1855–1937)
- Adrien Dauzats (French, 1804–1868)
- Édouard Debat-Ponsan (French, 1847–1913)
- Émile Deckers (Belgian, 1885–1968)
- Alexandre-Gabriel Decamps (French, 1803–1860)
- Gabriel-Charles Deneux (French, b. 1856)
- Charles-Émile-Callande de Champmartin (French, 1797–1883)
- Alfred de Dreux (French, 1810–1860)
- Willem de Famars Testas (Dutch, 1834–1896)
- Antoine de Favray (French, 1706–1798)
- Lockwood de Forest (American, 1850–1932)
- Godefroy De Hagemann (French, 1820–1877)
- Alfred Dehodencq (French, 1822–1882)
- Gustave Léonard de Jonghe (Belgian, 1829–1893)
- Ferdinand Victor Eugène Delacroix (French, 1798–1863)
- Jean-Léon Gérôme (French, 1824–1904)
- Eugène Jules Delahogue (French, 1867–1935)
- Nicolas de Largillierre (French, 1656–1746)
- Hippolyte Délié (French photographer in Egypt, fl. 1870–1890)
- Cesare Dell'Acqua (Italian, 1821–1905)
- Marguerite Delorme (French, 1876–1946)
- Robert Leon Demachy (French, 1859–1936) Orientalist photographer
- Bernard Boutet de Monvel (French, 1881–1949)
- Henry d'Estienne (French, 1872–1949)
- Julio Romero de Torres (Spanish, 1874–1930)
- Ludwig Deutsch (Austrian, 1855–1935)
- Narcisse Virgilio Díaz (French, 1807–1876)
- Sir Francis Bernard Dicksee (British, 1853–1928)
- Thomas Francis Dicksee (British, 1819–1895)
- Joaquín Diez (Spanish, d.1882)
- Frank Dillon (British, 1823–1909)
- Alphonse Étienne Dinet (French, 1861–1929)
- Sarkis Diranian (Armenian, 1854–1918)
- Jean Discart (French, 1855–1940)
- Francisco Domingo Marqués (Spanish, 1842–1920) .
- Joaquín Domínguez Bécquer (Spanish, 1817–1879)
- Manuel Domínguez Sánchez (Spanish, 1840–1906)
- Charles D'Oyly (British, 1781–1845)
- Ferdinand Duboc (French, 1813–1869)
- François Dubois (French, 1790–1871)
- Paul Élie Dubois (French, 1886–1949)
- Henriette Dubois-Damart, (French, 1885–1945)
- Édouard Louis Dubufe (French, 1819–1883)
- Maxime Du Camp (French, 1822–1894) Orientalist photographer and writer fr:Maxime Du Camp
- Charles Dufresne (French, 1876–1938)
- Raoul Dufy (French, 1877–1953)
- Edmund Dulac (French, 1882–1953)
- Frank Vincent DuMond (American, 1865–1951)
- Jean-Jules-Antoine Lecomte du Nouÿ (French, 1842–1923)
- Jean Durand (French, 1894–1977)
- Jean-Baptiste Henri Durand-Brager (French, 1814–1879)
- Etienne Duval (French, 1824–1914)
- Frank Duveneck (American, 1848–1919)

== E ==
- Édouard Edy-Legrand (French, 1892–1970)
- Victor Eeckhout (Belgian, 1821–1879)
- Ferencz Franz Eisenhut (Hungarian, 1857–1903)
- Émile Eisman-Semenowsky (French, 1857–1911)
- Tristram Ellis (English, 1844–1922)
- Rudolf Ernst (Austro-French, 1854–1932)
- José María Escacena y Daza (Spanish, 1800–1858)
- Joaquin Espalter y Rull (Spanish, 1809–1880)
- Juan Espina y Capó (Spanish, 1848–1933)
- Henry d'Estienne (French, 1872–1949)
- Lalla Essaydi (Arabic: لالة السعيدي) (Moroccan, b. 1956) photographer and painter
- Jose Etxenagusia (Spanish, 1844–1912)

== F ==
- Fabio Fabbi (Italian 1861–1946)
- Antonio Maria Fabrés y Costa (Catalan: Antoni Maria Fabrés i Costa) (Spanish, 1854–1938)
- James Fairman (American, 1826–1904)
- Luis Ricardo Falero (Spanish, 1851–1896) es:Luis Ricardo Falero
- Harry Fenn (British-American, 1837–1911)
- José María Fenollera (Spanish, 1851–1918)
- Roger Fenton (British, 1819–1869) Orientalist photographer
- Augustin Ferrando (French, 1880–1957)
- Anselm Feuerbach (German, 1829–1880)
- Ludwig Hans Fischer (Austrian, 1848–1915)
- Eugène Flandin (French, 1809–1889)
- Nicola Forcella (Italian, 1868–?)
- Mariano Fortuny (Spanish, 1838–1874)
- Gaspare Fossati (Italian, 1809–1883)
- Plácido Francés y Pascual (Spanish, 1834–1902)
- Luis Franco y Salinas (Spanish, 1850–1897)
- Mary Jett Franklin (American, 1842–1926)
- Émile Frechon (French, 1848–1921) Orientalist photographer
- Pál Fried (Hungarian/American, 1893–1976)
- Francis Frith (English, 1822–1898) Orientalist photographer
- Eugène Fromentin (French, 1820–1876)
- Antonio Fuentes (Spanish, 1905–1995)

== G ==
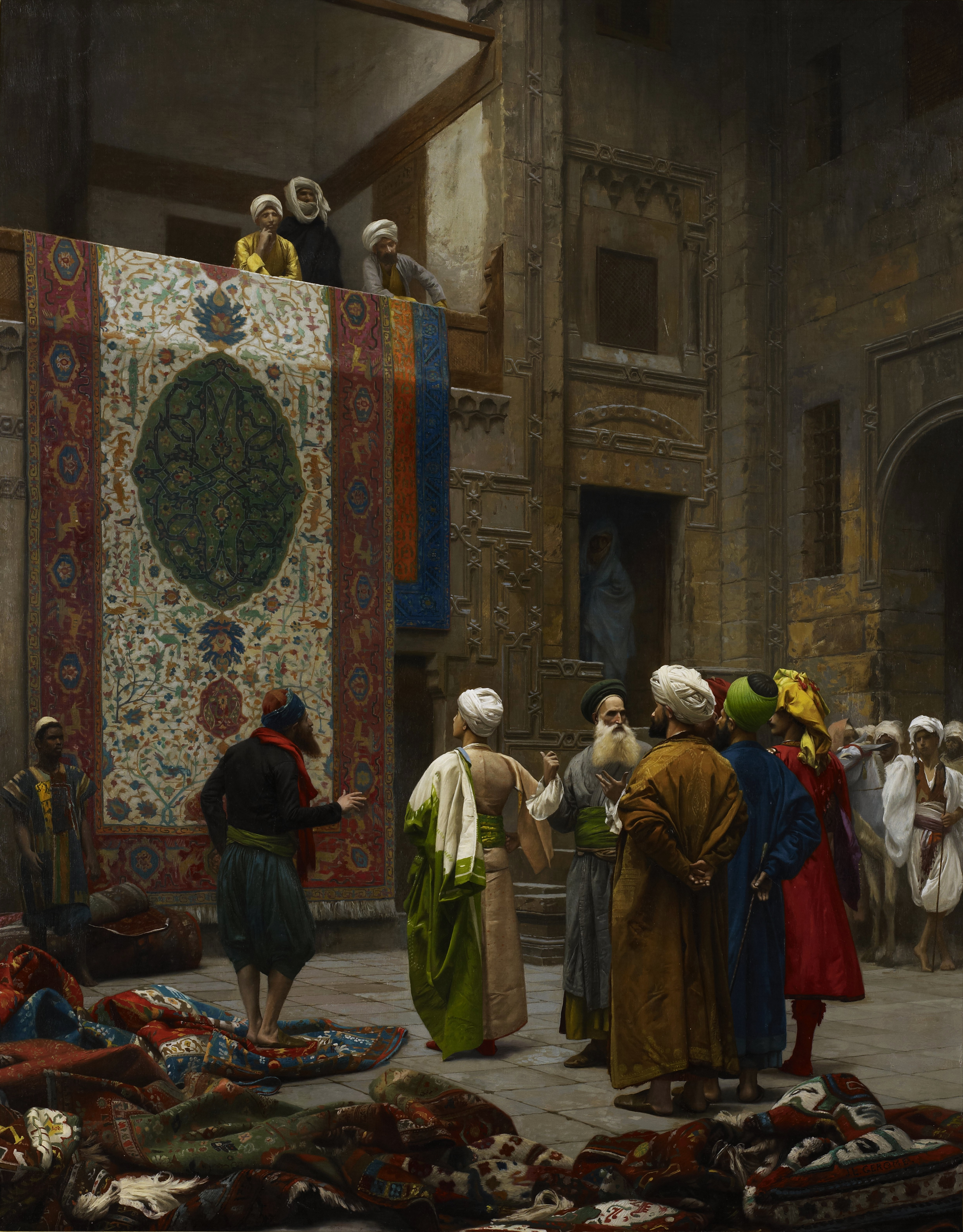
Jean-Léon Gérôme, The Carpet Merchant, c. 1887

- Pietro Gabrini (Italian, 1856–1926)
- William Gale (British, 1823–1909)
- José Gallegos y Arnosa (Spanish, 1857–1917)
- Aisha Galimbaeva (Kazakhstani, 1917–2008)
- Manuel García Hispaleto (Spanish, 1836–1898)
- Antonio García Mencía (Spanish, 1853–1915)
- Vicente García de Paredes (Spanish, 1845–1903)
- José García Ramos (Spanish, 1852–1912)
- Manuel García y Rodríguez (Spanish, 1863–1925)
- Antonio Gargiullo (Italian, 1897–1968)
- J. André Garrigues, (Orientalist photographer) (French, 1851–1901)
- José Garrigues y Motos (Spanish, 1883–?)
- Rafael Garzón (Spanish, Orientalist photographer) (1863–1923)
- Georges Gasté (French, 1869–1910) Orientalist photographer and painter
- Winckworth Allan Gay (American, 1821–1910)
- Théodore Géricault (French, 1791–1824)
- Jean-Léon Gérôme (French, 1824–1904)
- Alejandrina Gessler y Lacroix, also known as "Madame Anselme" (Russian-Spanish, 1831–1907)
- Robert Swain Gifford (American, 1840–1905)
- Sanford Robinson Gifford (American, 1823–1880)
- Paul-Albert Girard (French, 1839–1920)
- Eugène Alexis Girardet (French, 1853–1907)
- Joseph-Philibert Girault de Prangey (French, 1804–1892), Orientalist photographer
- Anne-Louis Girodet de Roussy-Trioson (French, 1767–1824)
- John Gleich (German, 1879–c.1927)
- Marc Gabriel Charles Gleyre (Swiss, 1806–1874)
- Eugenio Gómez Mir (Spanish, 1877–1938)
- Manuel Gómez-Moreno González (Spanish, 1834–1918)
- Manuel González Méndez (Spanish, 1843–1909)
- Edward Angelo Goodall (British, 1819–1908)
- Frederick Goodall (British, 1822–1904)
- Walter Gould (American, 1829–1893)
- Albert Goupil (French, 1840–1884) Orientalist photographer & art collector See also: Goupil & Cie
- Frédéric Goupil-Fesquet (French, 1817–1878) Orientalist photographer, active in Jerusalem on 11–14 December 1839
- Gustave Le Gray (French, 1820–1884) Orientalist photographer
- Marco de Gregorio (Italian, 1829–1876)
- Antoine-Jean Gros (French, 1771–1835)
- John Griffiths (artist) (British, 1837–1918)
- Guan Zeju (Chinese, b. 1941)
- Gianantonio Guardi (Italian, 1699–1760)
- Eugène Charles François Guérard (French, 1821–1866)
- Jules Guérin (artist) (American, 1866–1946)
- Gustave Achille Guillaumet (French, 1840–1887)
- Pierre-Désiré Guillemet (French, 1827–1878)
- Selma Gürbüz (Turkish, 1960-2021)

== H ==
- Carl Haag (Bavarian/British, 1820–1915)
- Arthur Trevor Haddon (British, 1864–1941)
- George Henry Hall (artist) (American, 1825–1913)
- Osman Hamdi Bey (Turkish, 1842–1910)
- Hans Hassenteufel (German, 1887–1943)
- Francesco Hayez (Italian, 1791–1882)
- René Charles Edmond His (French, 1877–1960)
- Theodor Hellwig (German, 1815–?)
- Léon Herbo (Belgian, 1850–1907)
- José Cruz Herrera (Spanish, 1890–1972)
- William Holman Hunt (British, 1827–1910)
- Nathaniel Hone the Younger (Irish, 1831–1917)
- Marius Hubert-Robert (French, 1885–1966)
- Victor Huguet (French, 1835–1902)
- Edmund Aubrey Hunt (American, 1855–1922)
- Jan-Baptist Huysmans (Belgian, 1826–1906)

== I ==
- Jean-Auguste Dominique Ingres (French, 1780–1867)
- Eugène Isabey (French, 1803–1886)
- Daniel Israel (Austrian, 1859–1901)
- Alexei Issupov (Russian, 1889–1957)
- Francisco Iturrino (Spanish, 1864–1924)

== J ==
- Jacob Jacobs (Belgian, 1812–1879)
- Paul Emil Jacobs (German, 1802–1866)
- Alexandre Jacovleff (Russian, 1887–1938)
- José Jiménez Aranda (Spanish, 1837–1903)
- Juan Jiménez Martín (Spanish, 1858–1901)
- Augustus Edwin John (British, 1878–1961)
- Charles Ellis Johnson (American, 1857–1926) photographer
- Pierre-Gustave Joly de Lotbinière (Swiss-French, 1798–1865) Orientalist photographer.
- Hugh Bolton Jones (American, 1848–1927)
- Gustave de Jonghe (Belgian, 1829–1893)
- Gustave-Henri Jossot (French, 1866–1951)
- Paja Jovanović (Serbian, 1859–1957)
- Svetislav Jovanović (Serbian, 1861–1933)
- Francisco Jover y Casanova (Spanish, 1836–1890)
- George William Joy (Irish, 1844–1925)

== K ==
- Wassily Kandinsky (Russian, 1866–1944)
- Nikolay Karazin (Russian, 1842–1908)
- Morteza Katouzian (Iranian, b. 1943)
- Adolf Kaufmann (Austrian, 1848–1916)
- Ivan Kazakov (Russian, 1883–1935)
- Miner Kilbourne Kellogg (American, 1814–1889)
- Robert Talbot Kelly (British, 1861–1943)
- Raphael Kirchner (Austrian, 1876–1917)
- Paul Klee (Swiss-German, 1879–1940)
- Yvonne Kleiss-Hertzig (French, 1895–1968)
- Elena Nikandrovna Klokacheva (Russian, 1871–c.1943)
- Ernst Koerner (German, 1846–1927)
- Oskar Kokoschka (Austrian, 1886–1980)
- Konstantin Korovin (Russian, 1861–1939)
- Franz Xaver Kosler (Austrian, 1864–1905)
- Setsuzo Kotsuji (Japanese, 1899–1973)
- Johann Victor Krämer (Austrian, 1861–1949) Orientalist photographer and painter
- Ivan Kramskoi (Russian, 1837–1887)
- Christian Krohg (Norwegian, 1852–1925)
- Pavel Kuznetsov (Russian, 1878–1968)
- Gülsün Karamustafa (Turkish, b, 1946)

== L ==
- José Laguna y Pérez (Spanish, 1835?–1883?)
- Francisco Lameyer Berenguer (Spanish, 1825–1877)
- Eugene Lanceray (Russian, 1875–1946)
- Augustus Osborne Lamplough (British, 1877–1930)
- Charles Landelle (French, 1821–1908)
- Georges Landelle (French, 1860–1898)
- Jean-Charles Langlois (French, 1789–1870)
- Joseph de La Nézière (French, 1873–1944)
- William Laparra (French, 1873–1920)
- José de Larrocha González (Spanish, 1850–1933)
- Jules Laurens (French, 1825–1901)
- Sir John Lavery (Irish, 1856–1941)
- Hippolyte Lazerges (French, 1817–1887)
- Paul Lazerges (1845–1902)
- Edward Lear (British, 1812–1888)
- Jean-Jacques-Francois Le Barbier (French, 1738–1826)
- Jules Lefebvre (French, 1834–1912)
- Rudolf Franz Lehnert (Austro-Hungarian, 1878–1948) Orientalist photographer
- Frederic Leighton (British, 1830–1896)
- Anton Robert Leinweber (German, 1845–1921)
- Charles-Amable Lenoir (French, 1860–1926)
- Alexandre-Louis Leloir (French, 1843–1884)
- Élisabeth Vigée Le Brun (French, 1755–1842)
- Paul Leroy (French, 1860–1942)
- John Frederick Lewis (British, 1805–1876)
- Karl Ludwig Libay (Slovak-Austrian, 1814/16–1888)
- Fernando Liger Hidalgo (Spanish, 1880–1945)
- Antal Ligeti (Hungarian, 1823–1890)
- Jean-Étienne Liotard (Swiss, 1702–1789)
- Juan Llimona Bruguera (Spanish, 1860–1926)
- Louis-Anselme Longa (French, 1809–1869)
- Edwin Longsden Long (British, 1829–1891)
- Ernest Wadsworth Longfellow (American, 1845–1921)
- Ricardo López Cabrera (Spanish, 1864–1950)
- José María López Mezquita (Spanish, 1883–1954)
- Vicente López Portaña (Spanish, 1722–1850)
- Pierre-Victorien Lottin (known as Victor Lottin de Laval) (French, 1810–1903)
- Eugenio Lucas Velázquez (Spanish, 1817–1870)
- Juan Luna y Novicio (Filipino, 1857–1899)
- Egron Sellif Lundgren (Swedish, 1815–1875)
- Fernand Lungren (American, 1857–1932)
- Alfredo Luxoro (Italian, 1859–1918)
- Nikiforos Lytras (Greek, 1832–1904)

== M ==
- Carlile Henry Hayes Macartney (British, 1842–1924)
- Andrew MacCallum (English, 1821–1902)
- Cesare Maccari (Italian, 1840–1919)
- Georg Macco (German, 1863–1933)
- Auguste Macke (German, 1887–1914)
- Raimundo de Madrazo y Garreta (Spanish, 1841–1920)
- Ricardo de Madrazo y Garreta (Spanish, 1852–1917)
- Albert Maignan (French, 1845–1908)
- Hans Makart (Austrian, 1840–1884)
- Konstantin Makovsky (Russian, 1839–1915)
- Jacques Majorelle (French, 1886–1962)
- Azouaou Mammeri (Algerian, 1886–1954)
- Vincent Manago (French, 1880–1936)
- Gustavo Mancinelli (Italian, 1842–1906)
- Giacomo Mantegazza (Italian, 1853–1920)
- Georges Henri Manzana Pissarro (French, 1871–1961)
- Vicente March (Spanish, 1859–1927)
- Ludovico Marchetti (Italian, 1853–1909)
- D.S. Margoliouth (English, 1858–1940)
- Pompeo Mariani (Italian, 1857–1927)
- Prosper Marilhat (French, 1811–1847)
- Vincenzo Marinelli (Italian, 1820–1892)
- Isidoro Marín Garés (Spanish, 1863–1926)
- Enrique Marín Sevilla (Spanish, 1876–1940)
- Ramón Martí i Alsina (Spanish, 1826–1894)
- Maria Martinetti (Italian, 1864–1921)
- Yvonne Mariotte (French, 1909–?)
- François de Marliave (French, 1847–1953)
- Tomás Martín Rebollo (Spanish, 1858–1919)
- Serafín Martínez del Rincón y Trives (Spanish, 1840–1892)
- Arcadio Mas i Fondevila (Spanish, 1852–1934)
- Frank Henry Mason (British, 1876–1965)
- Francisco Masriera y Manovens (Spanish, 1842–1902)
- Henri Matisse (French, 1869–1954)
- Virgilio Mattoni (Spanish, 1842–1923)
- V. G. Maunier (French, fl.1850s) Orientalist photographer, active in Egypt.
- Auguste Maure (French, 1840–1907) Orientalist photographer
- Luigi Mayer (Italian, 1755–1803)
- Clara Barthold Mayer (Swiss?, ?–after 1803)
- Gerardo Meléndez y Conejo (Spanish, 1856–after 1905)
- Arthur Melville (British, 1858–1904)
- Willard Leroy Metcalf (American, 1858–1925)
- Paul Friedrich Meyerheim (German, 1842–1915)
- Alphons Leopold Mielich (Austrian, 1863–1929)
- Jules Migonney (French, 1876–1929)
- Mireille Miailhe (French, 1921–2010)
- Natalya Milashevich (Russian, b. 1967)
- Eric Milet (French, 1870–1950) Orientalist photographer
- Addison Thomas Millar (American, 1850–1913)
- Francis Davis Millet (American, 1848–1912)
- Camillo Miola (Italian, 1840–1919)
- Adolphe Joseph Thomas Monticelli (French, 1824–1886)
- Harry Humphrey Moore (American, 1844–1926)
- Gabriel Morcillo (Spanish, 1887–1973)
- Gustave Moreau (French, 1826–1898)
- Max Moreau (Belgian, 1902–1992)
- Tomàs Moragas (Spanish, 1837–1906)
- Domenico Morelli (Italian, 1826–1901)
- José Moreno Carbonero (Spanish, 1860–1942)
- Avedis Mouradian (Armenian, 1895–?)
- Harry Siddons Mowbray (American, 1858–1928)
- Gerard Gustaaf Muller (Dutch, 1861–1929)
- William James Müller (British, 1812–1845)
- Leopold Carl Müller (Austrian, 1834–1892)
- Domingo Muñoz (Spanish, 1850–1935)
- Antonio Muñoz Degrain (Spanish, 1840–1924)
- Tomás Muñoz Lucena (Spanish, 1860–1943)
- Manuel Muñoz y Otero (Spanish, 1850–1900)
- Takamitsu Muraoka (Japanese, 1938–2026)

== N ==
- José Navarro y Llorens (Spanish, 1867–1923)
- Louis-Antonin Neurdein (French, 1846–1914) (Orientalist photographer)
- Henry Roderick Newman (American, 1833–1918)
- Charles Wynne Nicholls (Irish, 1831–1903)
- José Nicolau y Bartomeu (Spanish, fl.1868–1884)
- Vicente Nicolau Cotanda (Spanish, 1852–1898)
- José Nicolau Huguet (Spanish, 1855–1909)
- Aleksandr Nikolayev (Russian, 1897–1957)
- Josep Nin i Tudó (Spanish, 1843–1908)
- Francesco Noletti, also known as Francesco Fieravino (Maltese, 1611–1654)
- Ernest Normand (British, 1857–1923)
- Elizabeth Nourse (American, 1859–1938)
- Édouard Auguste Nousveaux (French, 1811–1867)
- Jean-Jules-Antoine Lecomte du Nouÿ (French, 1842–1923)

== O ==
- Mariano Obiols Delgado (Spanish, c.1860–1911)
- Frans Wilhelm Odelmark (Swedish, 1849–1937)
- Aloysius O'Kelly (Irish, 1853–1941)
- Eugenio Oliva y Rodrigo (Spanish, 1852–1925)
- Quintana Olleras (Spanish, 1851–1919)
- Karel Ooms (Belgian, 1845–1900)
- Georg Emanuel Opiz (German, 1775–1841)
- François d'Orléans (French, 1818–1900)
- José Ortega (Spanish, 1877–1955)
- Antonio Ortiz Echagüe (Spanish, 1883–1942)
- José Ortuño Úbeda (Spanish, 1943–1999)
- Pierre Outin (French, 1840–1899)

== P ==
- Vicente Palmaroli González (Spanish, 1834–1896)
- Andrés Parladé (Spanish, 1859–1933)
- Walter Launt Palmer (American, 1854–1932)
- Frederic L. Pape (American, 1870–1938)
- Paul Pascal (French, 1832–1903)
- Şeker Ahmed Pasha (Turkish, 1841–1907)
- Alberto Pasini (Italian, 1826–1899)
- Paolino Pavesi-Bulbi (Italian, fl. late 19th century)
- Élie Anatole Pavil (French, 1873–1948)
- J Pavlikevitch (Russian?, 1893–1936)
- Eugène Pavy (French, 1840–1905) painter, brother of Philipe Pavy
- Philippe Pavy (French, 1860–?) painter, brother of Eugène Pavy
- Charles Sprague Pearce (American, 1851–1914)
- Josep Lluís Pellicer i Fenyé (Catalan, 1842–1901)
- Francisco Peralta del Campo (Spanish, 1837–1897)
- Jenaro Pérez de Villaamil y d'Huguet (Spanish, 1807–1854)
- Ella Ferris Pell (American, 1846–1922)
- Josep Lluís Pellicer y Fenyé (Spanish, 1842–1901)
- Frank (Francis) Crawford Penfold (American, 1849–1921)
- José Arpa y Perea (Spanish, 1858–1952)
- Thomas Phillips (British, 1770–1845)
- Henry William Pickersgill (British, 1782–1875)
- William Lamb Picknell (American, 1853–1897)
- Anton Pieck (Dutch, 1895–1987)
- Harold H. Piffard (British, 1867–1939)
- Otto Pilny (Swiss, 1866–1936)
- Auguste-Émile Pinchart (French, 1842–1920)
- Louis Émile Pinel de Grandchamp (French, 1831–1894)
- Niko Pirosmanishvili (Russian, 1862–1919)
- Casto Plasencia y Maestro (Spanish, 1846–1890)
- Johann Georg Platzer (Austrian, 1704–1761)
- Francisco Pradilla Ortiz (Spanish, 1848–1921)
- Stanislav Plutenko (Russian, b.1961)
- Paul Poiret (French, 1879–1944)
- Vasily Polenov (Russian, 1844–1927)
- Henri Pontoy (French, 1888–1968)
- Gustav Pope (English, 1831–1910)
- Jean-François Portaels (Belgian, 1818–1895)
- Jan Portielje (Dutch, 1829–1908)
- Lucien Whiting Powell (American, 1846–1930)
- Francisco Pradilla Ortiz (Spanish, 1848–1921)
- Luigi Premazzi (Italian, 1814–1891)
- Amedeo Preziosi (Maltese, 1816–1882)
- Val Prinsep (British, 1838–1904)
- Pavlos Prosalentis (Greek, 1784–1837)
- Clemente Pujol de Guastavino (Spanish, 1850–1905)

== R ==
- Max Rabes (German, 1868–1944)
- Mohammed Racim (Algerian, 1896–1975)
- Manuel Ramírez Ibáñez (Spanish, 1856–1925)
- Théodore Ralli (Greek, 1852–1909)
- Louis Randavel (French-Algerian, 1869–1947)
- Vittorio Rappini (Italian, 1877–1939)
- Charles Rauch (French, 1791–1857)
- Grace Ravlin (American, 1873–1956)
- Roberto Raimondi (Italian, 1877–c.1957)
- Alexandre-Georges-Henri Regnault (French, 1843–1871)
- Frederic Sackrider Remington (American, 1861–1909)
- Ilya Repin (Russian, 1844–1930)
- Antonio María Reyna Manescau (Spanish, 1859–1937)
- Édouard Frédéric Wilhelm Richter (French, 1844–1913)
- Albert Gabriel Rigolot (French, 1862–1932)
- Antonio Rivas (Italian/Spanish, 1845–1911)
- David Roberts (Scottish, 1796–1864)
- Agustín Robert y Surís (Spanish, 1860–1913)
- Charles Robertson (British, 1844–1891)
- James Robertson (British, 1813–1888)
- Ángel Rodríguez Tejero (Spanish, fl. 1870s/80s)
- Luisa Rodríguez de Toro (Spanish, fl. 1850s)
- Marie Lucas Robiquet (French, 1858–1959)
- Ettore Roesler Franz (Italian, 1845–1907)
- Georges Rochegrosse (French, 1859–1938)
- José María Rodríguez-Acosta (Spanish, 1878–1941)
- Pedro Roig Asuar (Spanish, 1885–1971)
- Andreas Roller (German-Russian, 1805–1891)
- Julius Rolshoven (American, 1858–1930)
- Rafael Romero Barros (Spanish, 1832–1895)
- Julio Romero de Torres (Spanish, 1874–1930)
- Eduardo Rosales (Spanish, 1836–1873)
- Giulio Rosati (Italian, 1858–1917)
- Domenico Rosso (Italian, 1832–1902)
- André Thomas Rouault (French, 1899–1949)
- Franz Alekseevitch Roubaud (Russian, 1856–1928)
- Santiago Rusiñol (Spanish, 1861– 1931)
- Alexander Nikolaivich Russov (Russian, 1884–1928)
- Alexandre Roubtzoff (Russian, 1884–1949)
- Henri Émilien Rousseau (French, 1875–1933)
- Ferdinand Roybet (French, 1840–1920)
- José Ruiz de Almodóvar (Spanish, 1867–1942)
- Charles Marion Russell (American, 1864–1928)
- Albert Pinkham Ryder (American, 1847–1917)

== S ==
- Paul Saïn (French, 1853–1908)
- Emilio Sala (Spanish, 1850–1910)
- Juan Pablo Salinas Teruel (Spanish, 1871–1946)
- Emilio Sánchez Perrier (Spanish, 1855–1907)
- Adolf Karol Sandoz (Polish, 1845–1921)
- Francisco Sans Cabot (Spanish, 1828–1881)
- Ricardo Santa Cruz Garcia-Pablos (Spanish, 1855–1913)
- Rubens Santoro (Italian, 1859–1942)
- John Singer Sargent (American, 1856–1925)
- Martiros Saryan (Armenian, 1880–1972)
- William Sartain (American, 1843–1924)
- Hubert Sattler (Austrian, 1817–1904)
- Henri Sauvaire (French photographer, 1831–1896)
- Symeon Savvidis (Greek, 1859–1927)
- Alice Schille (American, 1869–1955)
- Herbert Gustave Schmalz, also known as Herbert Carmichael (British, 1856–1935)
- Max Schödl (Austrian, 1834–1921)
- Adolf Schreyer (German, 1828–1899)
- Alois Hans Schram (Austrian, 1864–1919)
- Georg Engelhard Schröder (Swedish, 1684–1750)
- Annibale Scognamiglio (Italian, fl. 1860s/70s)
- Pascal Sébah (Syriac-Armenian, 1823–1886) Orientalist photographer
- Jean Pascal Sébah (Syriac, 1872–1947) Orientalist photographer
- Stephan Sedlacek (Austrian, 1868–1936)
- Adolf Seel (German, 1829–1907)
- Pablo Segarra Chias (Spanish, b. 1945)
- José Segrelles Albert (Spanish, 1885–1969)
- Mamerto Seguí Arechevala (Spanish, 1862–1908)
- Rafael Senet Pérez (Spanish, 1856–1926)
- Zinaida Serebriakova (Russian, 1884–1967)
- Enric Serra Auqué (Spanish, 1859–1918)
- Nicasio Serret y Comín (Spanish, 1849–1880)
- Thomas Frederick Mason Sheard (British, 1866–1921)
- Vasily Shulzhenko (Russian, b. 1949)
- Eugène Siberdt (Belgian, 1851–1931)
- Nicolas Sicard (French, 1846–1920)
- Paul Signac (French, 1863–1935)
- Giuseppe Signorini (Italian, 1857–1932)
- Joaquín Sigüenza y Chavarrieta (Spanish, 1825–1902)
- José Silbert (French, 1862–1936)
- Arsênio da Silva (Brazilian, 1833–1883)
- Mateo Silvela Casado (Spanish, 1863–1948)
- Enrique Simonet Lombardo (Spanish, 1866–1927)
- Amedeo Simonetti (Italian, 1874–1922)
- Attilio Simonetti (Italian, 1843–1925)
- Ettore Simonetti (Italian, 1857–1909)
- Gustavo Simoni (Italian, 1846–1926)
- Niels Simonsen (Danish, 1807–1885)
- Henry Singleton (British, 1766–1839)
- Jean-Paul Sinibaldi (French, 1857–1909)
- Joseph Sintès (Spanish-Algerian, 1829–1913)
- Max Slevogt (German, 1868–1932)
- Ernest Slingeneyer (Belgian, 1820–1894)
- Vasily Smirnov (Russian, 1858–1890)
- Joseph Lindon Smith (American, 1863–1950)
- Reyyan Somuncuoğlu (Turkish, b. 1959)
- Simeon Solomon (British, 1840–1905)
- Benito Soriano Murillo (Spanish, 1827–1891)
- Joaquín Sorolla y Bastida (Spanish, 1863–1923)
- Carl Spitzweg (German, 1808–1885)
- Bedros Sirabyan (Turkish, 1833–1898)
- Kajetan Stefanowicz (Polish, 1886–1920)
- Charles Auguste Guillaume Steuben (French, 1788–1856)
- Agapit Stevens (Belgian, 1848–1924)
- Julius LeBlanc Stewart (American, 1855–1919)
- Vincent G. Stiepevich (Italian, 1841–1921)
- Anton Strassgschwandtner (Austrian, 1826–1881)
- Arthur Streeton (Australian, 1867–1943)
- Adam Styka (Polish, 1890–1959)
- André Suréda (French, 1872–1930)
- Vardges Sureniants (Armenian, 1860–1921)
- James Augustus Suydam (American, 1819–1865)
- Rudolf Swoboda (Austrian, 1859–1914)
- Barbara Szota-Hartavi (Polish, Turkish, b.1989)
- Pantaleon Szyndler (Polish, 1846–1905)

== T ==
- François Tabar (French, 1818–1869)
- Lawrence Alma-Tadema (Dutch, 1836–1912)
- Lucio Tafuri (Italian, b. 1941)
- Josep Maria Tamburini (Spanish, 1856–1932)
- Marguerite Tedeschi (French, 1879–1970)
- Salomon Taib (Algerian, 1877–1954)
- Henry Ossawa Tanner (American, 1859–1937)
- Henri Adrien Tanoux (French, 1865–1923)
- Edmond Tapissier (French, 1861–1943)
- Enrico Tarenghi (Italian, 1848–1938)
- Jules Taupin (French, 1863–1932) painter and photographer
- Paul Tavernier (French, 1852–1943)
- Douglas Arthur Teed (American, 1860–1929)
- Franciszek Tepa (Polish, 1829–1889)
- Henry Jones Thaddeus (Irish, 1859–1929)
- Charles James Theriat (American, 1860–1937)
- Felix Thomas (French, 1815–1875) architect, painter and engraver
- John Rollin Tilton (Italian-American, 1828–1888)
- Alfred Wordsworth Thompson (American, 1840–1896)
- René Thomsen (French, 1897–1976)
- Louis Comfort Tiffany (American, 1848–1933)
- James Tissot (French, 1836–1902)
- Jean-Baptiste-Ange Tissier (French, 1814–1876)
- Charles Toché (French, 1851–1916)
- Edoardo Tofano (Italian, 1838–1920)
- Gyula Tornai (Hungarian, 1861–1928)
- Francesc Torrescassana (Spanish, 1845–1918)
- Odoardo Toscani (Italian, 1859–1914)
- Charles-Émile de Tournemine (French, 1812–1872)
- Renée Tourniol (French, 1876–1953)
- Pierre Trémaux (French, 1818–1895) photographer, illustrator, architect
- Emanuele Trionfi (Italian, 1832–1900)
- Wincenty Trojanowski (Polish, 1859–1928)
- Paul Désiré Trouillebert (French, 1829–1900)
- Edward Troye (Swiss-American, 1808–1874)
- Periklis Tsirigotis (Greek, 1860–1924)
- Ramón Tusquets y Maignon (Spanish-Italian, 1837–1904)
- Walter Frederick Roofe Tyndale (British, 1855–1943)

== U ==
- Marcelino de Unceta y López (Spanish, 1835–1905)
- Manuel Ussel de Guimbarda y Malibrán (Spanish, 1833–1907)
- Stefano Ussi (Italian, 1832–1901)

== V ==
- Pierre Henri Vaillant (French, 1878–1939)
- Pierre Valade (French, 1909–1971)
- Alberto Valenzuela Llanos (Chilean, 1869–1925)
- Alfredo Valenzuela Puelma (Chilean, 1856–1909)
- Salvatore Valeri (Italian, 1856–1946)
- Francisco de Paula Van Halen (Spanish, 1814–1887)
- José María Velasco Gómez (Mexican, 1840–1912)
- Charles Valfort (French, 1808–1867)
- Augusto Valli (Italian, 1867–1945)
- Jules Pierre van Biesbroeck (Belgian, 1873–1965)
- Jean-Baptiste van Mour (Flemish–French, 1671–1731)
- Charles-André van Loo (French, 1705–1765)
- Theodore van Ryselberge (Belgian, 1862–1926)
- Anna Maria van Schurman (Dutch, 1607–1678)
- Alexander Varnek (Russian, 1782–1843)
- Elihu Vedder (American, 1836–1923)
- Pedro de Vega y Muñoz (Spanish, c.1845–1910)
- Auguste Veillon (Swiss, 1834–1890)
- Armand Vergeaud (French, 1876–1949)
- Vasily Vereshchagin (Russian, 1842–1904)
- Horace Vernet (French, 1789–1863)
- Émile Vernet-Lecomte (French, 1821–1900)
- Alexandre René Veron (French, 1826–1897)
- Paolo Veronese (Italian, 1528–1588)
- Jules Jacques Veyrassat (French, 1828–1893)
- Marcel Vicaire (French, 1893–1976)
- Miguel Vico Hernández (Spanish, 1850–1933)
- Henri Villain (French, 1878–1938)
- Jenaro Pérez Villaamil (Spanish, 1807–1854)
- Ricardo Villodas y de la Torre (Spanish, 1846–1904)
- Franz Vinck (Belgian, 1827–1903)
- Salvador Viniegra y Lasso de la Vega (Spanish, 1862–1915)
- Frédéric Villot (Belgian, 1809–1875) engraver and conservator
- Alexander Nikolaevich Volkov (Russian, 1886–1957)
- Arthur von Ferraris (Hungarian, 1856–after 1928)
- Themistokles von Eckenbrecher (German, 1842–1921)
- Rudolf Otto von Ottenfeld (Austrian, 1856–1913)
- Gaston Vuillier (French, 1845–1915)

== W ==
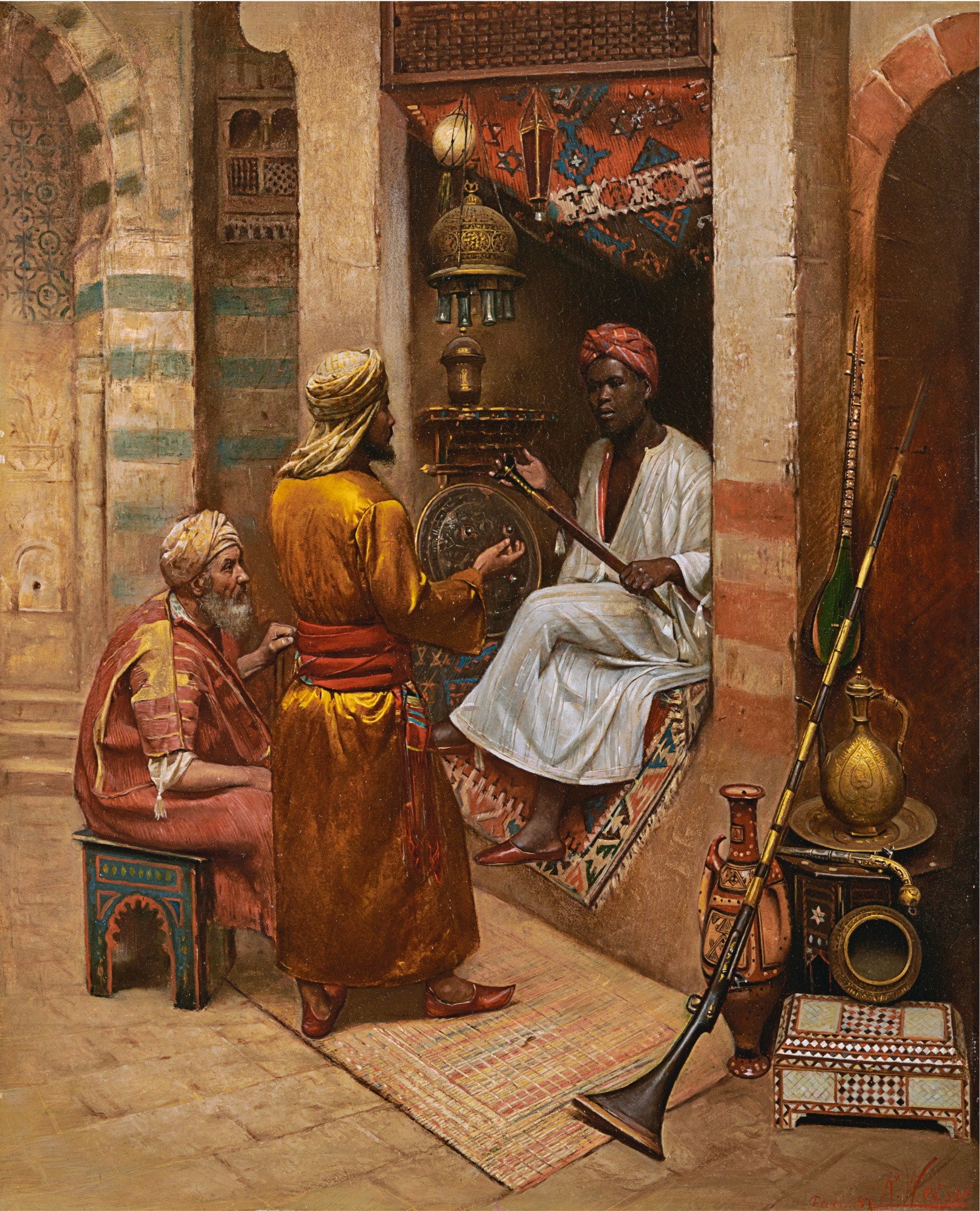
The Antiques Seller by Rudolf Weisse, 1887

- Ferdinand Wachsmuth (French, 1802–1869)
- Ferdinand Georg Waldmüller (Austrian, 1793–1865)
- Frank Waller (American, 1842–1923)
- Henry de Waroquier (French, 1881–1970)
- Georges Washington (French, 1827–1910)
- John William Waterhouse (British, 1849–1917)
- Marcus Waterman (American, 1834–1914)
- Edwin Lord Weeks (American, 1849–1903)
- John Reinhard Weguelin (British, 1849–1927)
- Rudolf Weisse (Czech, 1869 – c. 1930)
- Carl Werner (German, 1808–1894)
- Edwin White (American, 1817–1877)
- Charles Wilda (Austrian, 1854–1907)
- Sir David Wilkie (British, 1785–1841)
- James Tibbits Willmore (British, 1800–1863)
- William Clarke Wontner (British, 1857–1930)
- Feliks Michał Wygrzywalski (Polish, 1875–1944)

== Y ==
- Alexander Yakovlev (Russian, 1887–1938)
- Dmitri Ivanovich Yermakov (Russian, 1846–1916) photographer
- George Henry Yewell (American, 1830–1923)

== Z ==
- Emmanuel Zamor (Brazilian, 1840–1917)
- Adelphoi Zangaki (Brothers Zangaki) (Greek, fl.1860–1890) photographers active in Egypt.
- Fausto Zonaro (Italian, 1854–1929)
- Félix Ziem (French, 1821–1911)
- Marguerite Thompson Zorach (American, 1887–1968)
- Anders Leonard Zorn (Swedish, 1860–1920)

== See also ==
- Léonce Bénédite – early patron of Orientalist art and founder of the Société des Peintres Orientalistes Français
- List of artistic works with Orientalist influences
- Orientalism
- Orientalism in early modern France
- Oriental studies
- Société des Peintres Orientalistes Français (Society for French Orientalist Painters)
