= Odoardo Toscani =

Italian painter (1859–1914)

- Born: 19 December 1859; Rome
- Died: 13 June 1914 (aged 54); Smyrna, Ottoman Empire
- Known for: Painter, Writer, Diplomat
- Movement: Orientalist; Genre painting

Odoardo Toscani (19 December 1859 – 13 June 1914) was an Italian painter, mainly of portraits and battle scenes, genre scenes and Orientalist themes.

== Life and career ==
He was born in Rome in 1859 from David Toscani (a professor of Forensic Law and dean of the School of Medicine of the University of Rome La Sapienza) and Augusta Leonini-Pignotti (a noblewoman). He graduated in Law from the University of Rome. He undertook a career as a diplomat and later in life traveled to Tunisia, Turkey and to Egypt where he served as Consul General in representation of the Kingdom of Italy.

He was a painter who focused primarily on battle scenes, and paintings of orientalist themes. Among his works: Crimea, August 15, 1855, was presented at Exposition of Turin of 1883. Among other military themed paintings: In Marcia; L'Alt, and Le Grandi Manovre. Un Etèra was exhibited in Rome in 1883.

He was also a writer and intellectual figure, whose writings included short stories, poems, and critical essays. He died in Smyrna, Turkey.

== See also ==
- List of Orientalist artists
- Orientalism
