= J. Pavlikevitch =

- Born: Й. or Дж. Павликевич; Unknown, presumably Russian Empire
- Died: Unknown, presumably Turkey
- Known for: Watercolor painting
- Movement: Orientalism

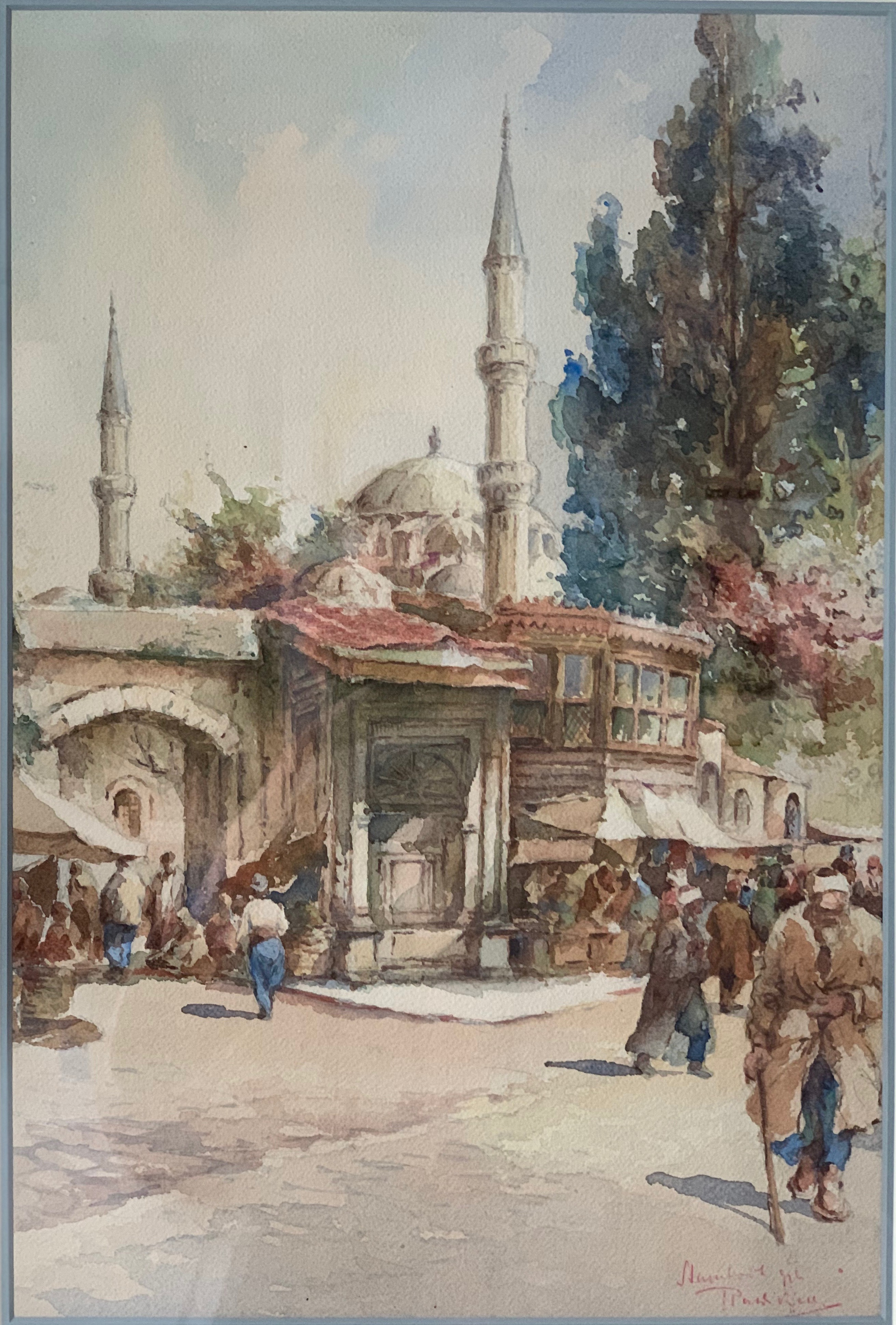
Ancient gate near Aya Sophia Mosque, Sultanahmet, with caption "Stamboul [1]916"

J. Pavlikevitch (Russian: Й. or Дж. Павлике́вич; active 1893–1936) was a watercolor painter, putatively of Russian origin, who was active in Istanbul, Turkey, (Note: Then called Constantinople; the Byzantine-era parts of the city were known by some as Stamboul.) in the early decades of the 20th century.

== Introduction ==
Very little is known about the artist, J. Pavlikevitch (or Pavlikevich). It is thought that he (or she) was part of a large number of civilians and members of the White Russian Army (collectively known as white émigrés) who, after struggling against the Bolsheviks in the Russian Civil War following the Soviet Revolution, retreated to the South Crimea and then to Istanbul, where they stayed in the Imperial city until about 1925. Shortly after, and with the help of charities and international organizations, they departed the city and emigrated to other countries.

== Biography ==
"On the Bosphorus, at the Entrance to the Golden Horn," circa 1900.

Virtually nothing is known about this watercolor artist or his life. It is assumed, based on the dates of his works (1893–1936), that he was one of the many 'old establishments' who fled Russia before or during the revolution and succeeding civil war. But aside from a few dozen watercolors, there is no other record of his life.

== Known work ==
Works by this artist have been sold at many fine auction houses around the world (examples include Skinners, Bonhams, Christies), commanding high prices solely on the strength of his work and in spite of the fact that nothing is known about his life, training, or other accomplishments.

Examples of J. Pavlikevitch's work may be found in several books, including Views of Russia & Russian Works on Paper, plates 81–87, and Russian Orientalism & Constantinople, plates 61–66.

Select list of works

His more notable works include:

- Stroll along the Bosphorus
- On the Bosphorus, at the Entrance to the Golden Horn, circa 1900
- Constantinople Street Cafe
- Street Vendors,
- Near the Galata Bridge
- Sunset on the Golden Horn, Istanbul
- Figures in the Courtyard of the Bayezid II Mosque
- The Interior of a Mosque
- Constantinople Street Café
- Market Scene

== See also ==
- List of Orientalist artists
- Orientalism
