= Frans Wilhelm Odelmark =

Swedish painter (1849–1937)

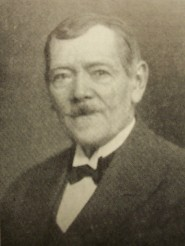
- Born: Frans Wilhelm Odelmark; 8 February 1849; Västervik, Sweden
- Died: 20 November 1937 (aged 88); Stockholm, Sweden
- Education: Royal Academy of Arts in Stockholm; Düsseldorf and Munich
- Known for: Painter
- Movement: Orientalist

Frans Wilhelm Odelmark (1849–1937) was a Swedish artist noted for his genre paintings and Orientalist themes.

== Life and career ==
He studied at the Royal Academy of Arts in Stockholm and after that in Düsseldorf and in Munich. He painted people in everyday live and picturesque architectural subjects, mainly with subjects from Europe and the Orient, staying in Egypt for an extended period and where he made many colourful paintings of Cairo. He executed works in watercolor, pastel and oil.

== Gallery ==
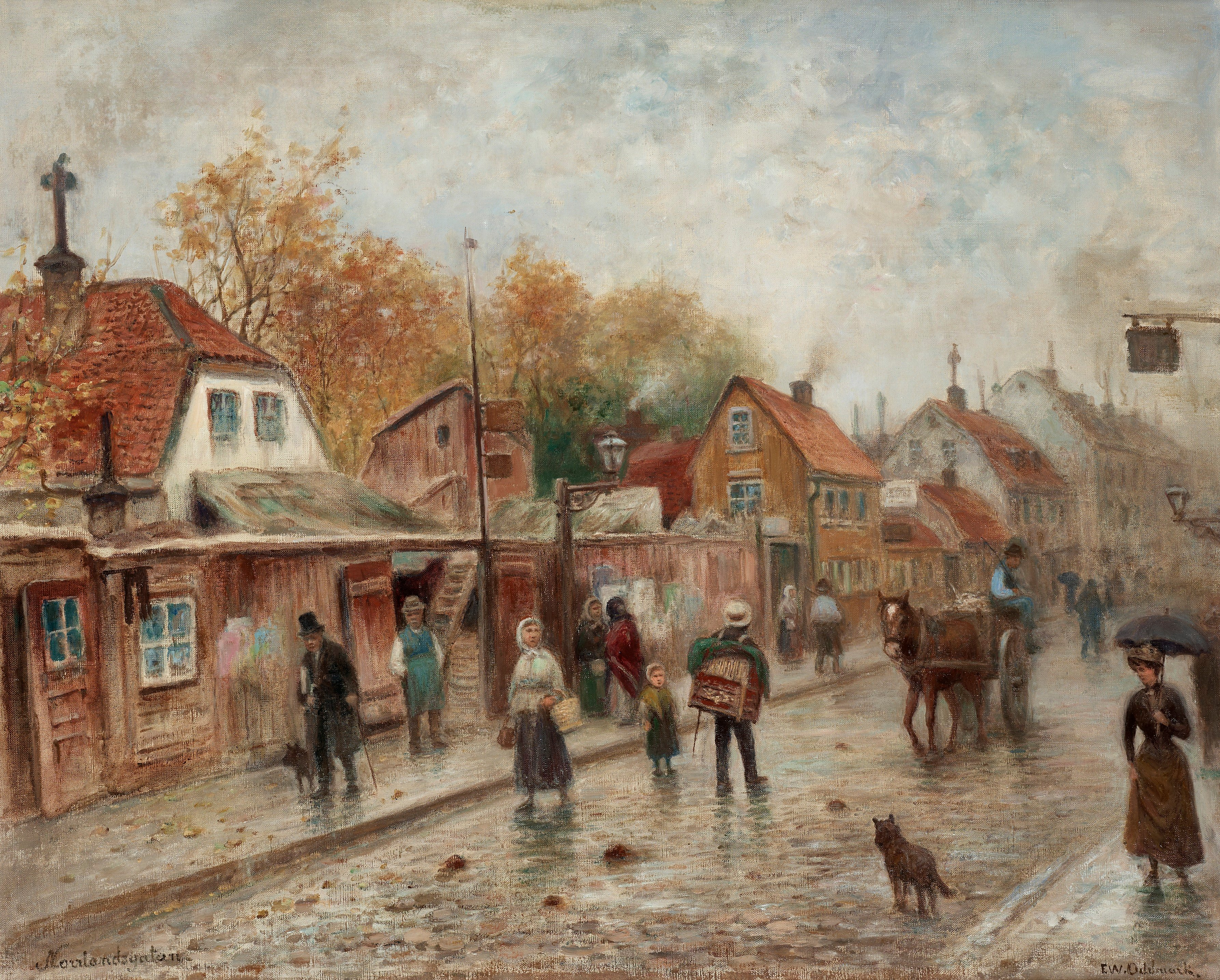
Norrlandsgatan

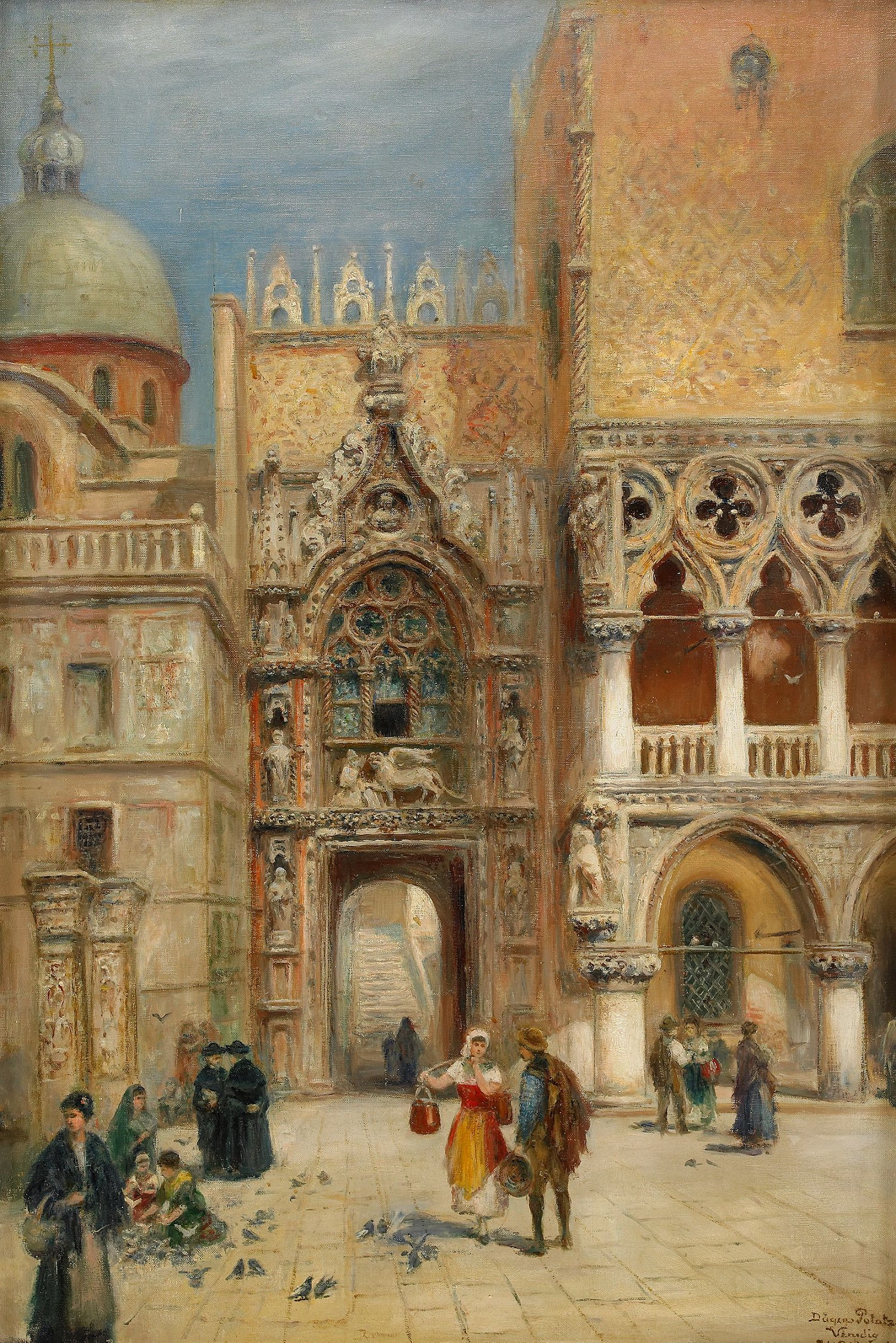
Doge's Palace, Venice

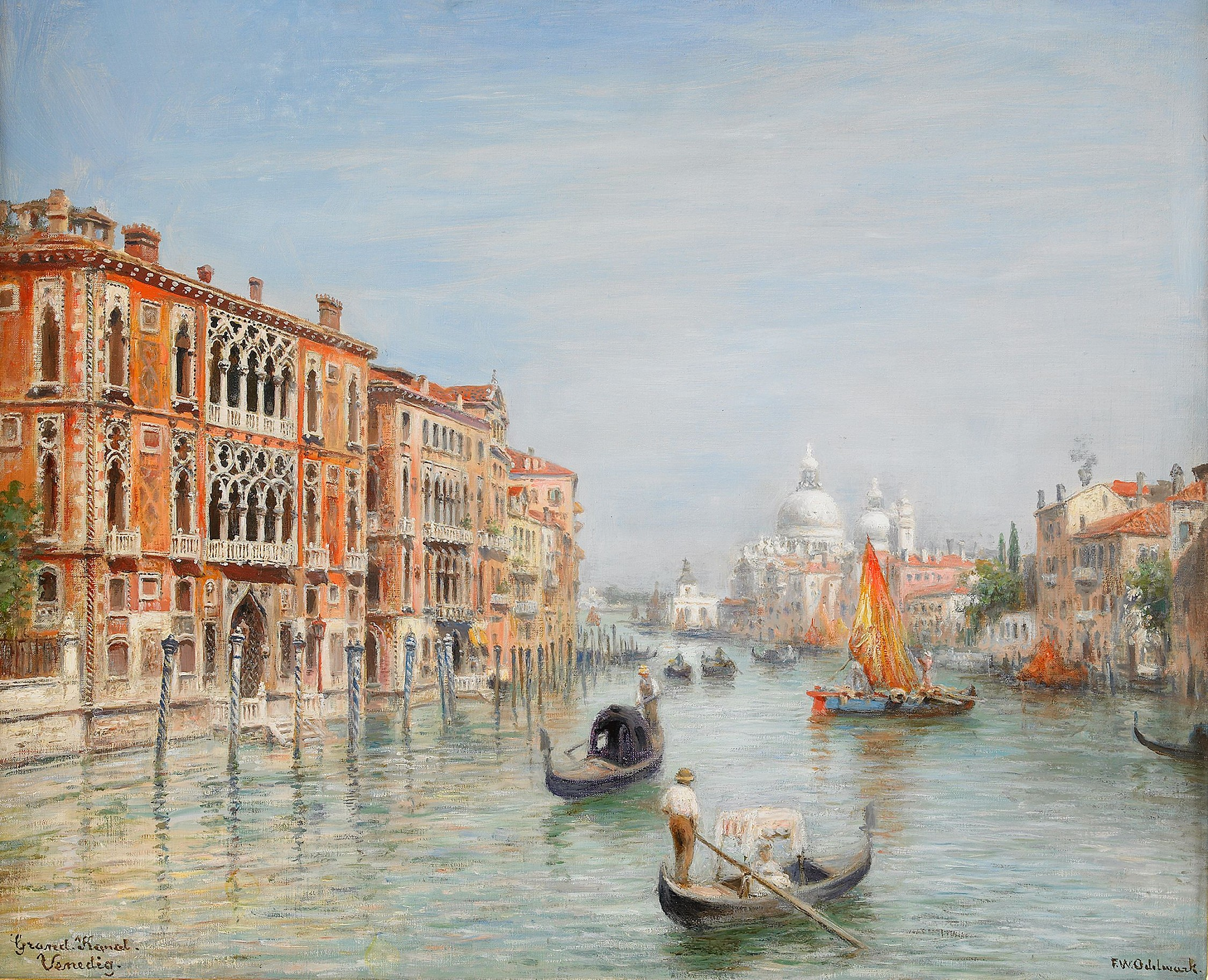
Grand Canal, Venice

== See also ==
- List of Orientalist artists
- Orientalism
