= Émile Deckers =

Belgian painter

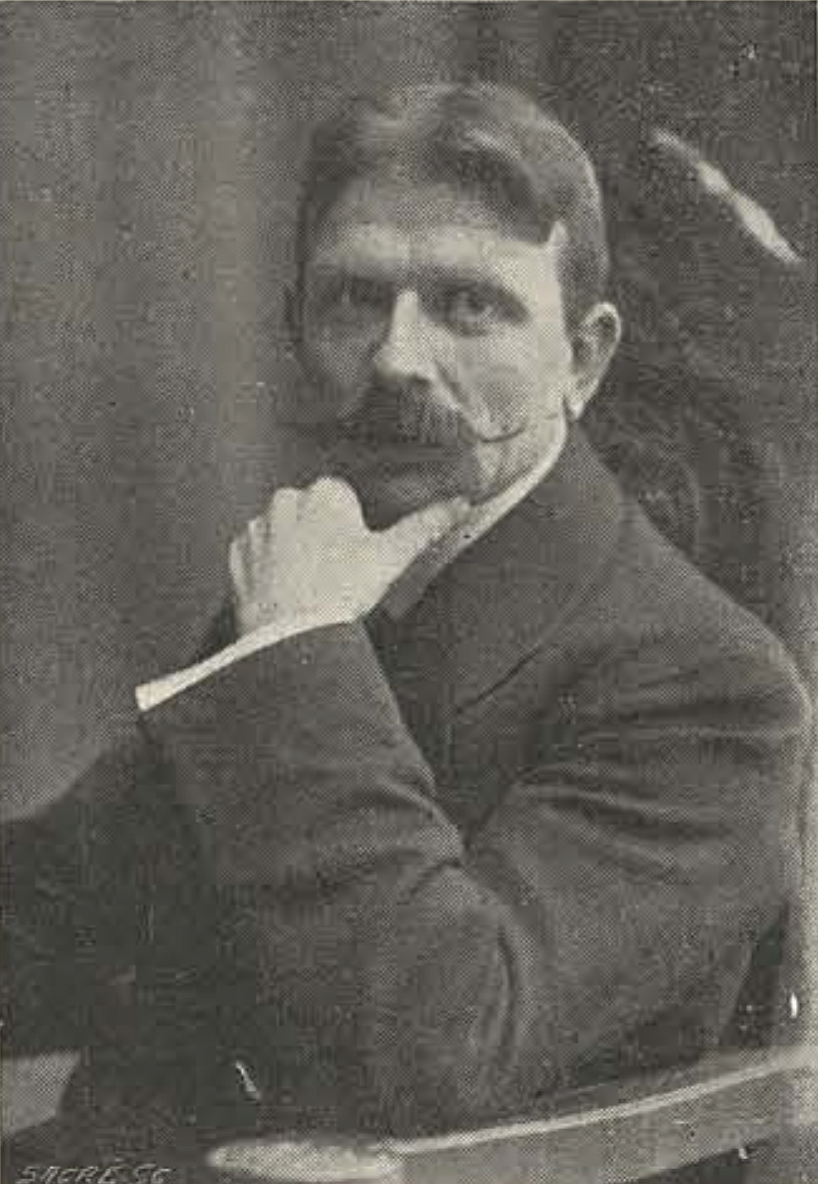
- Émile Deckers, aged 60 years in Algeria
- Born: 9 January 1885; Ensival, Belgium
- Died: 6 February 1968 (aged 83); Verviers, Belgium
- Education: Académie royale des beaux-arts, Liège
- Occupation: Painter
- Movement: Orientalist

Émile Deckers (9 January 1885 – 6 February 1968) was a Belgian painter.

== Life and career ==
Émile Deckers was born at Enisval in Belgium on 9 January 1885. He received his art education at the Académie royale des beaux-arts in Liège. He was the recipient of many art prizes before the outbreak of the first world war.

In 1921 he moved to Algiers, French Algeria, where he became an Orientalist painter. where he rapidly achieved a high level of popularity for his portraits.

== Work ==
He executed many portraits of Algerian women. His portraits of Arab people are thought to be very authentic.

His work has been auctioned by Christie's and Sotheby's.

== See also ==
- List of Orientalist artists
- Orientalism
