= Ettore Cercone =

Italian painter

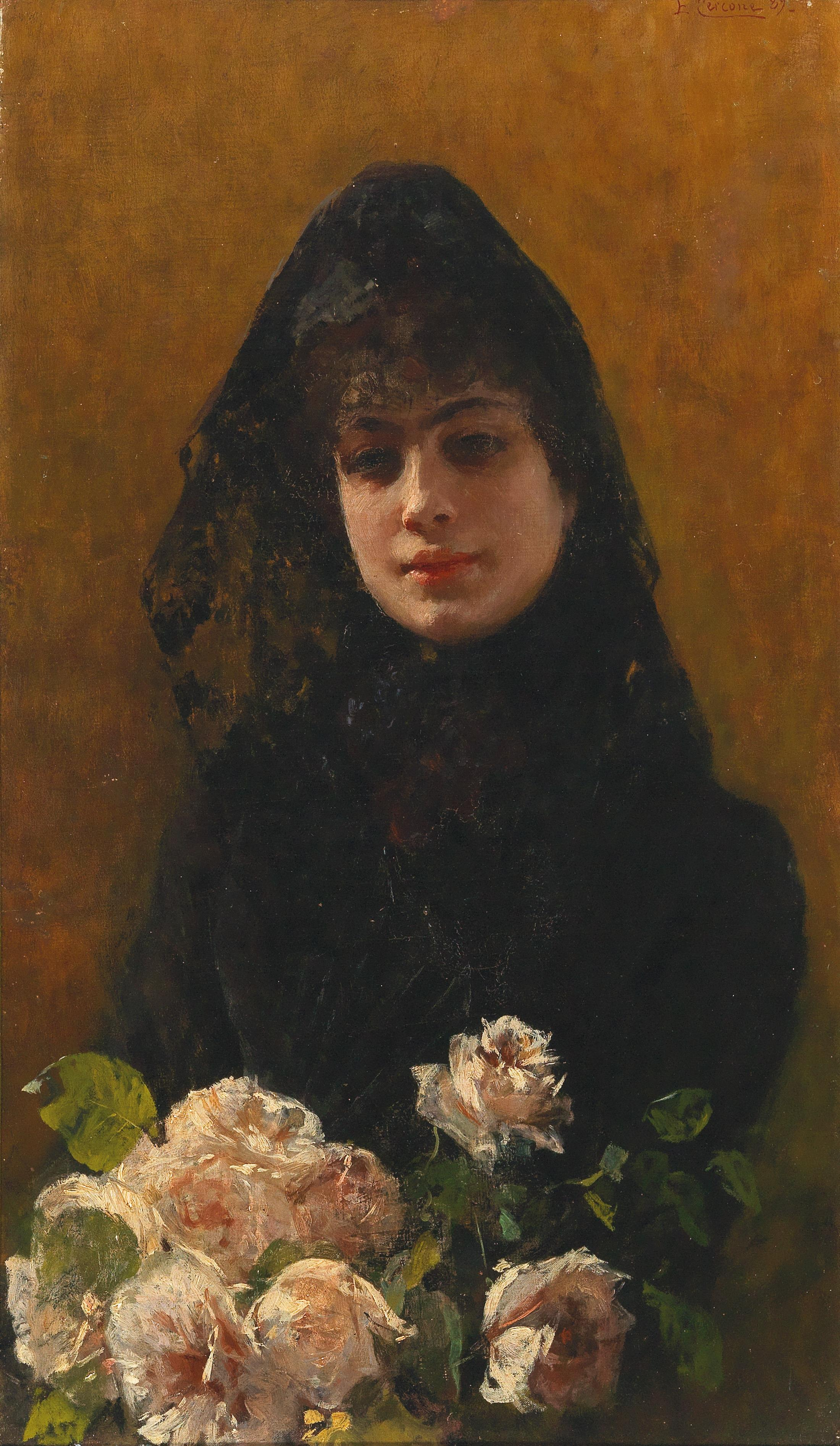
A Flower Greeting, by Ettore Cercone, 1889

Ettore Cercone (November 21, 1850 — September 12, 1896) was an Italian painter, mainly of female figures, seascapes and orientalist subjects. He was an officer of the Italian Royal Navy, but retired to dedicate himself to painting.

== Life and career ==
Cercone was born in Messina on 21 November 1850. He was the son of Francesco Cercone and his wife, Celeste Irene. He joined the navy at a very young age and rose to the level of lieutenant in 1878. While at sea, during the Battle of Lissa (1866), he painted the Governolo. His career took him to the West Indies where he began collecting specimens of marine flora and fauna for the "Aquarium" station in Naples. He worked as a researcher at the "Aquarium" 1883 and 1884 where he found that he could devote himself more fully to painting. He left active service in the Navy in 1888 but went into the Naval Reserve, where he was promoted to a rocket captain two years later.

He is believed to have lived in Naples during his Navy career. Almost all of his paintings remain in Naples and the region. His paintings have clear references to the Neapolitan artistic culture of the late nineteenth century, and in particular to Domenico Morelli, which whom he perhaps also had a more direct relationship. In 1880, he produced nine paintings with Arabic figures. Following that, he concentrated on Oriental themes which were very popular with the bourgeois society of the time. Cercone's works are difficult to locate since most of them are in private collections. Cercone died at Sorrento on 12 September 1896.

== Selected works ==
- Governolo (1866)
- Arab Prayer
- At the Pyramids (exhibited in Milan in 1883)
- Belly Dancing
- Madame Chrisanthème (exhibited to the Promoter of Naples in 1896)
- Caracciolo who claims Christianity (signed and dated 1888, now in the Museum of St. Martin in Naples)
- A Flower Greeting, (1889)
- Madonna (1891) (now in the National Gallery of Rome)
- Ainis
- Oriental Figures
- Harem Girl
- Moorish Water Carrier
- The Vision
- Evening Prayer
- Arab Women
- Seagulls (now in a private collection)

== See also ==
- List of Orientalist artists
