= Marius Hubert-Robert =

French painter

- Born: 10 June 1885; Paris, France
- Died: 15 March 1966 (aged 80)
- Known for: Painter
- Movement: Orientalist
- Patrons: Astor family

Marius Hubert-Robert (10 June 1885 – 15 March 1966) was a French Orientalist painter and illustrator.

== Biography ==
Hubert-Robert was born in Paris in 1885. He is the great-great nephew of the celebrated landscape painter Hubert Robert (22 May 1733 – 15 April 1808). His artistic ancestry also includes Aphonse Robert (his grand father) who was the private painter of Louis Philippe I, and Jean-Francois Robert (his great-grand father, Professor of painting at the Grand Duchy of Tuscany during the Napoleonic Era.

=== Career ===
Hubert-Robert mounted notable exhibitions at the Salon des Indépendants in 1929, at the Société des Artistes Français, at the Société Nouvelle des Beaux Arts, and at the Salon d'Hiver.

As a painter in the 10th Army during World War I, Hubert-Robert donated two of his war paintings to the Musée du Luxembourg.

Among his principal exhibitions are:

- Paris, Galerie Charpentier "De l'Alaska à la Terre de Feu"(1926); "Sous le signe du Soleil, Afrique du Nord" (1928); "Le Bassin Méditerranéen" (1931); Galerie Petit, Hôtel de la Duchesse de Rohan, Galerie Mona Lisa à Paris;
- London: The Mansion House, Alpin Club;
- United States: New York, Washington, Boston, Philadelphia, New Orleans, Chicago, Detroit, San Francisco, Los Angeles, Portland, Seattle, Cleveland, Buffalo;
- Canada: Québec, Montréal, Ottawa, Toronto, Winnipeg, Calgary, Edmonton, Vancouver, Victoria;
- Brazil: Rio de Janeiro;
- Argentina: Buenos Aires, Rosario de Santa Fe
- Other: Athens, Zurich, Munich, Algiers, and Beyrouth.

All of these exhibitions were at the invitation of the local French ambassadors and consuls.

Hubert-Robert was sponsored by the Astor family for a decade, allowing him to travel extensively, notably to the United States and Canada, but also to Africa (Morocco and Egypt), Greece and Indochina. He also worked with the magazine L'Illustration (circa 1930 - 1938).

== Work ==
- Women and Children at the Well of FRÉMIGNY, 1776
- Vue du Maroc, [View of Morocco], date unknown
- Caprice architectural avec ruines antiques, [Caprice architecture with ancient ruins], date unknown
- City of Paris, 1880
- Downtown San Francisco 1880
- Normandy Scene, date unknown
- Scène de rue animée, [Animated street scene], date unknown
- La Kasbah de Khénifra, [Kasbah at Khénifra], date unknown

== See also ==
- List of Orientalist artists
- Orientalism
