= Louis Randavel =

French painter

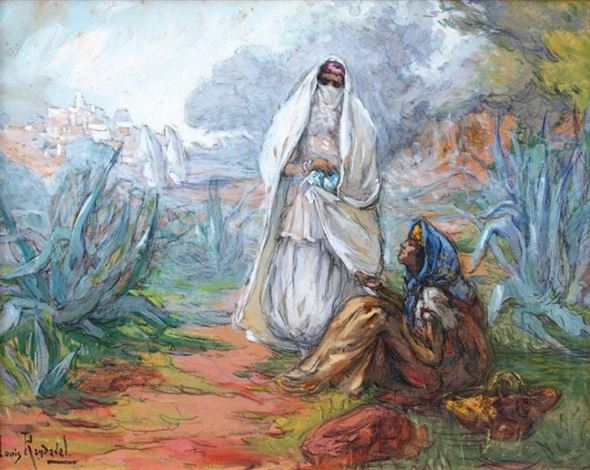
Women Along a Path

Louis Randavel (1869, Bône – 1947, Douéra) was a French-Algerian Orientalist painter.

== Biography ==
His family was originally from Nîmes. As a young man, he went to Paris, where he studied drawing, later serving as a teacher of that subject.

Following World War I, he became a professor in Philippeville (now known as Skikda), then in Constantine. At that time, he visited Kabylie and would come to spend much of his spare time there, painting landscapes.

After retiring, in 1929, he moved to Douéra, in the Algerian Sahel, and continued to paint Orientalist-themed scenes.

His early work shows the influence of Jean-Baptiste-Camille Corot.

== Sources ==
- Marion Vidal Bué, L'Algérie et ses peintres, Éditions Paris-Méditerranée, Paris, Alger, 2002, ISBN 2-84272-143-8
- Victor Barrucand, L'Algérie et les peintres Orientaliste, Éditions du Tell, 2005, ISBN 978-9961-7730-8-6
- Élizabeth Cazenave, Dictionnaire des peintres d'Algérie, Éditions de l'Onde, 2010, ISBN 978-2-916929-27-9
