= Franz Xaver Kosler =

Austrian painter

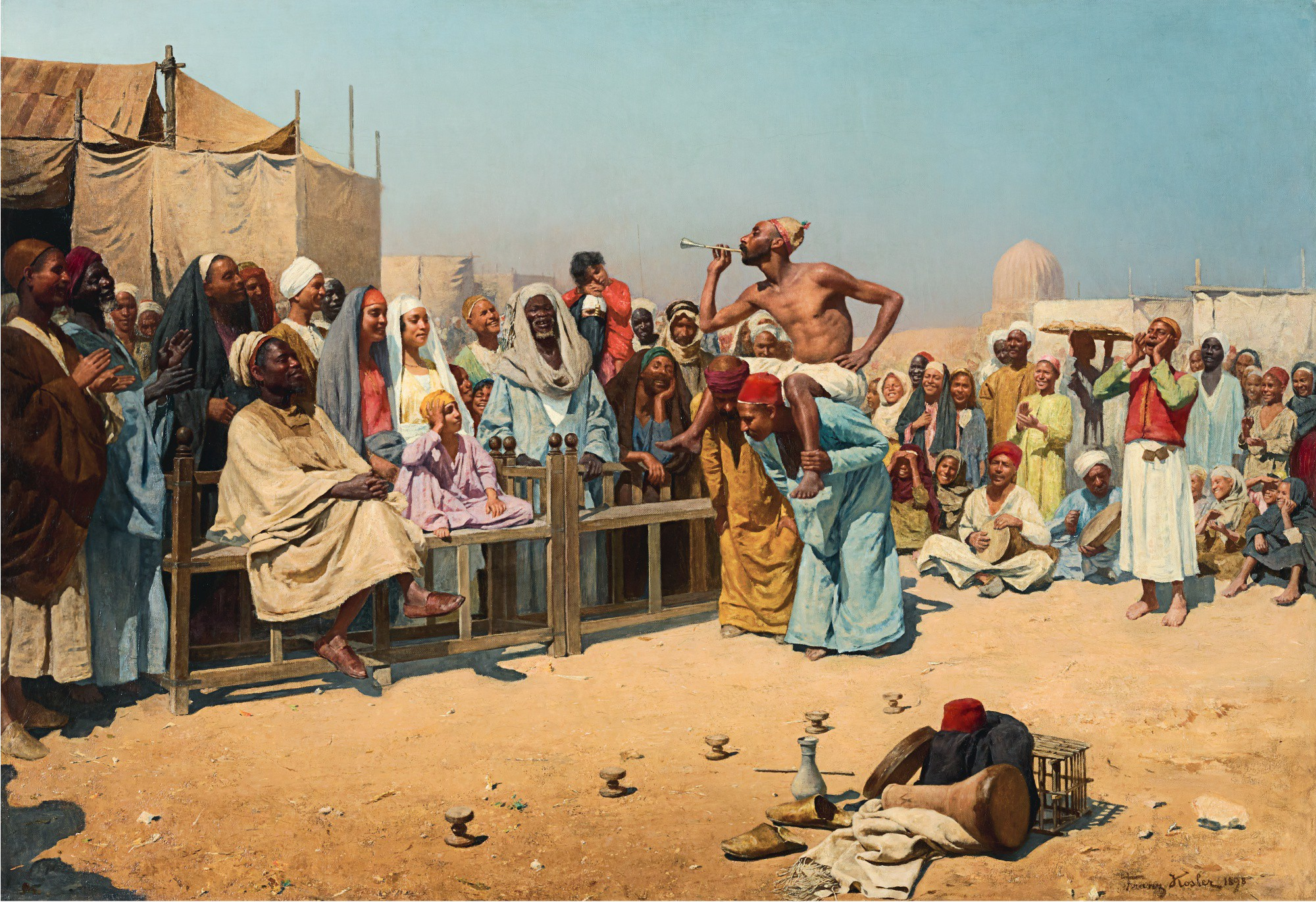
The Entertainers

Franz Xaver Kosler (16 August 1864, Vienna – 15 December 1905 in Syracuse, Sicily) was an Austrian painter; primarily known for his Orientalist portraits and genre scenes. Much of his work was done in Egypt and the Balkans.

== Life and work ==
From 1881 to 1884, he studied at the municipal painting school, under the direction of Christian Griepenkerl. He then transferred to the Academy of Fine Arts where, from 1884 to 1885, he attended the "Special School for History Painting", studying with Leopold Carl Müller.

Beginning in 1886, he took several study trips to the Balkans and, thanks to financial support from Archduke Franz Ferdinand, he was able to make several trips to Egypt after 1892. His first successful exhibition took place in Cairo.

Most of his portraits are of the common people of Egypt, although he also painted some notable figures. The majority of his works are in private collections.

== Sources ==
- "Kosler, Franz Xaver". In: Österreichisches Biographisches Lexikon 1815–1950 (ÖBL). Vol. 4, Austrian Academy of Sciences, Vienna 1969, p. 146.
- Herbert Zemen: Der Orientmaler Franz Kosler, 1864-1905. Self published, Vienna, 2011
