= Émile Eisman-Semenowsky =

French painter

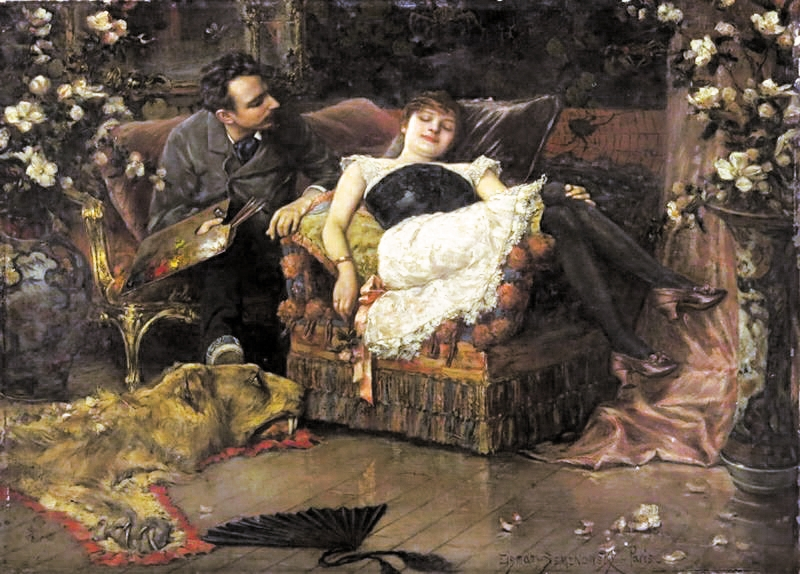
The Resting Model (with a self-portrait of Eisman, 1892)

Émile Eisman-Semenowsky, born Emil Eismann (19 September 1853, St. Petersburg - 31 July 1918, Paris) was a Russian-born, French-Polish painter, possibly Jewish, ancestry. He specialized in portraits of women; including many in the Orientalist style.

== Life and work ==
There are few documented sources concerning his life and education, although it is known that he emigrated at an early age and arrived in Paris in the 1880s, where he began doing sentimentalized portraits of upper class women, tailored to bourgeois tastes.

He also worked as an assistant to the Belgian painter, Jan van Beers; serving as a witness in a case involving two critics who accused Van Beers of copying from photographs.

In addition to portraits, he did some nudes and genre scenes. He often worked in Algeria, beginning in 1890; depicting women in traditional costume, as well as their daily dress. Many of his paintings are in private collections in the United States.

== Gallery ==
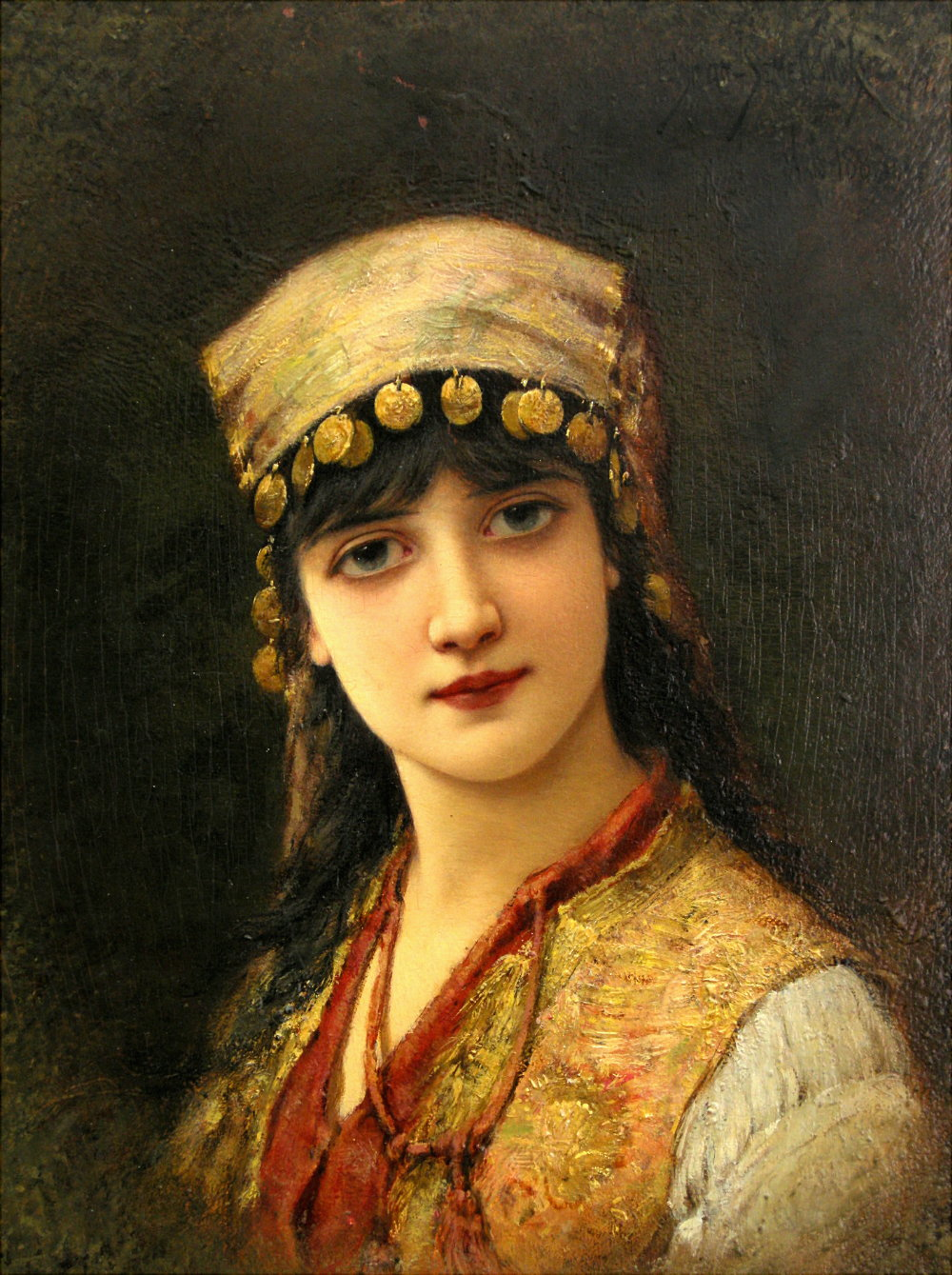
An oriental beauty, 1883

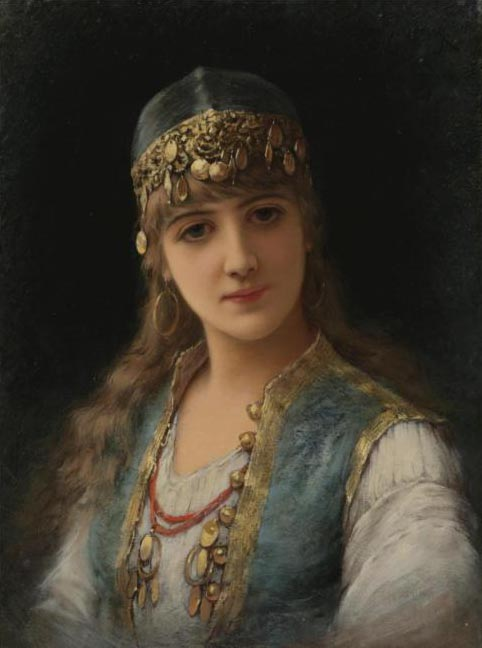
Harem beauty, before 1911

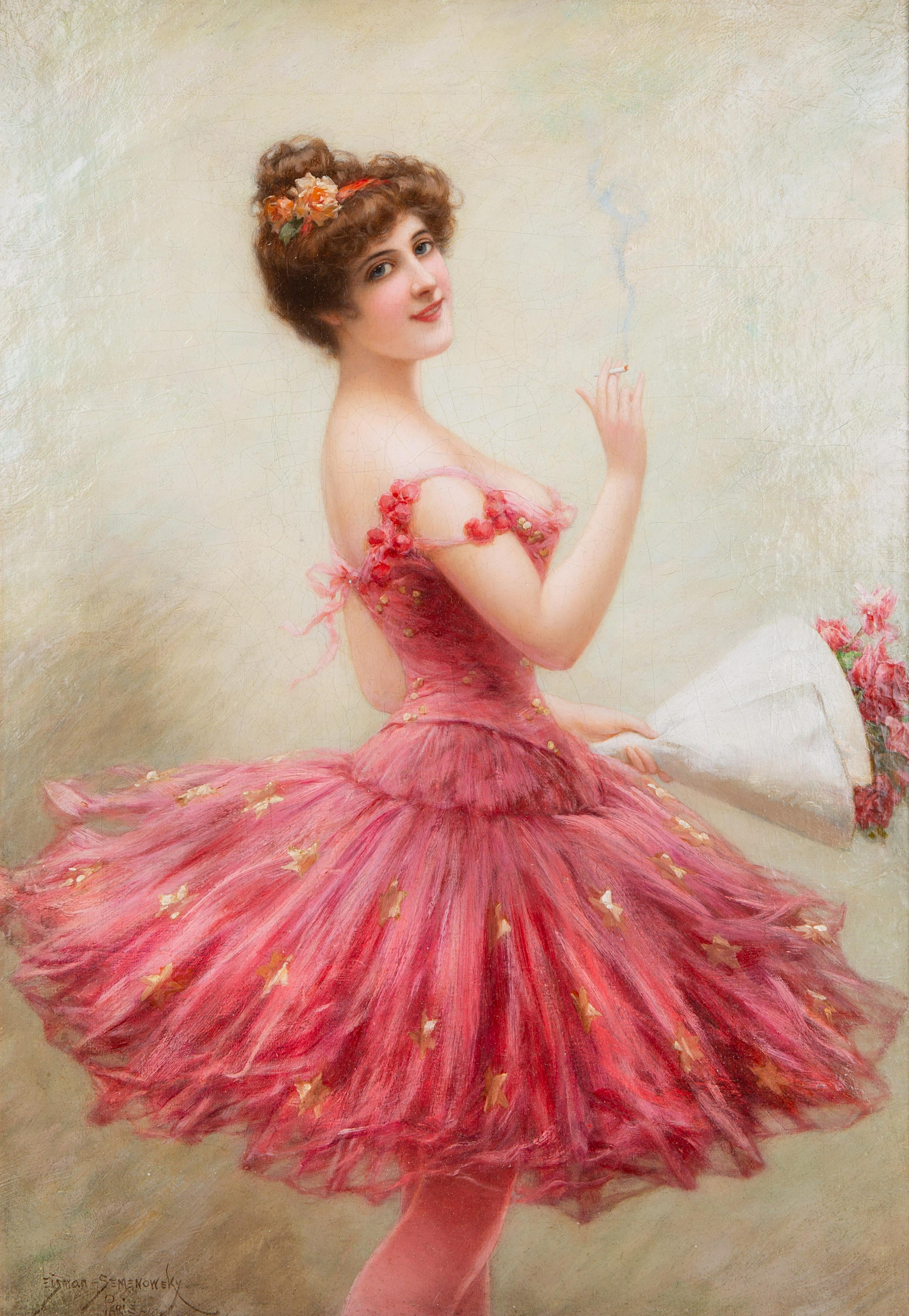
After the Show, 1900

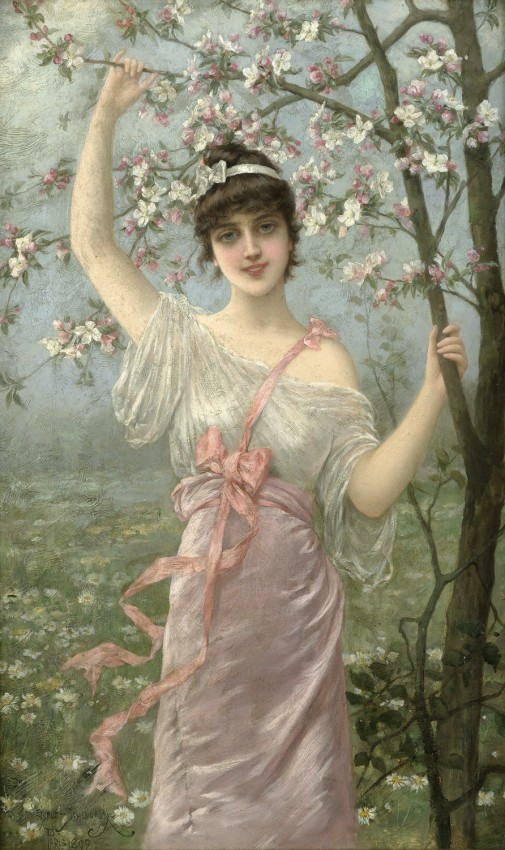
Young woman by a blossoming cherry tree, 1899

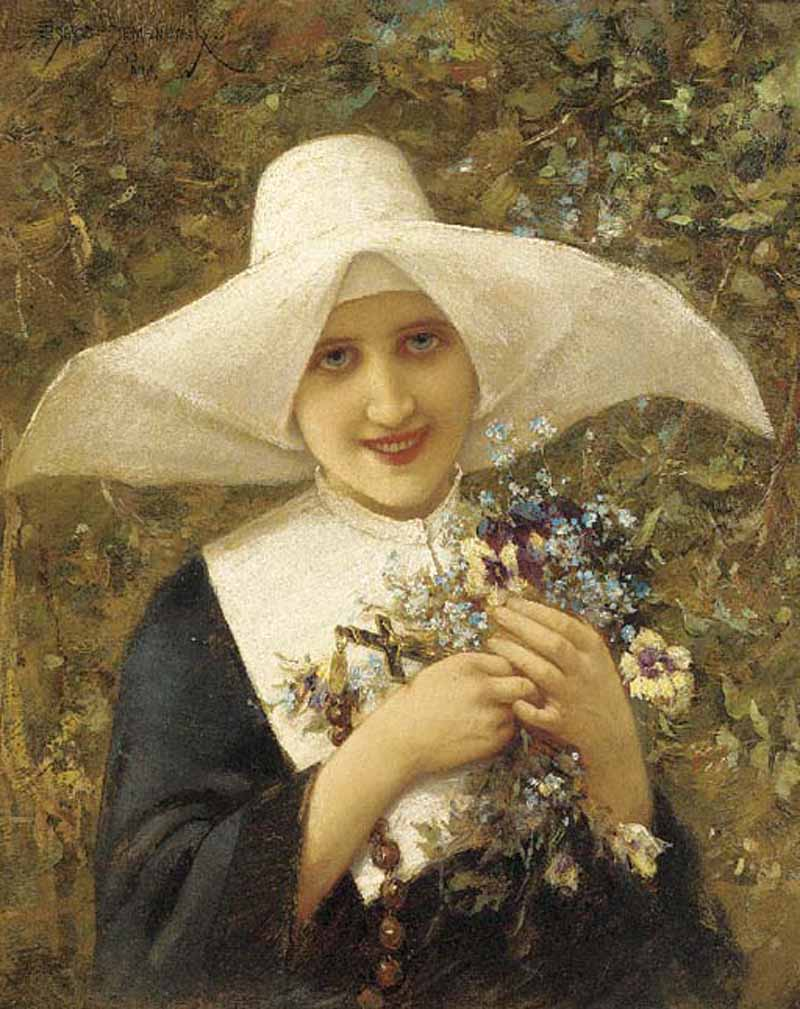
The Nun, 1900

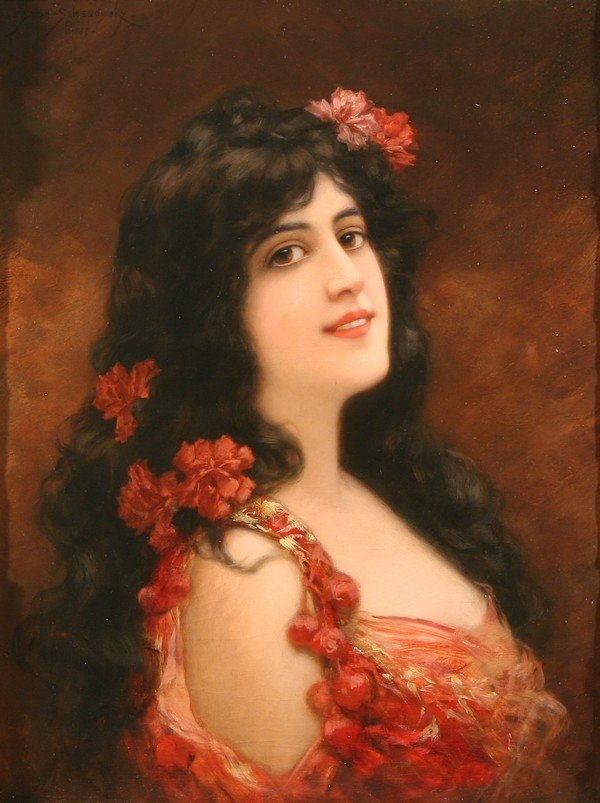
Young Girl with Flowers in her Hair, 1900

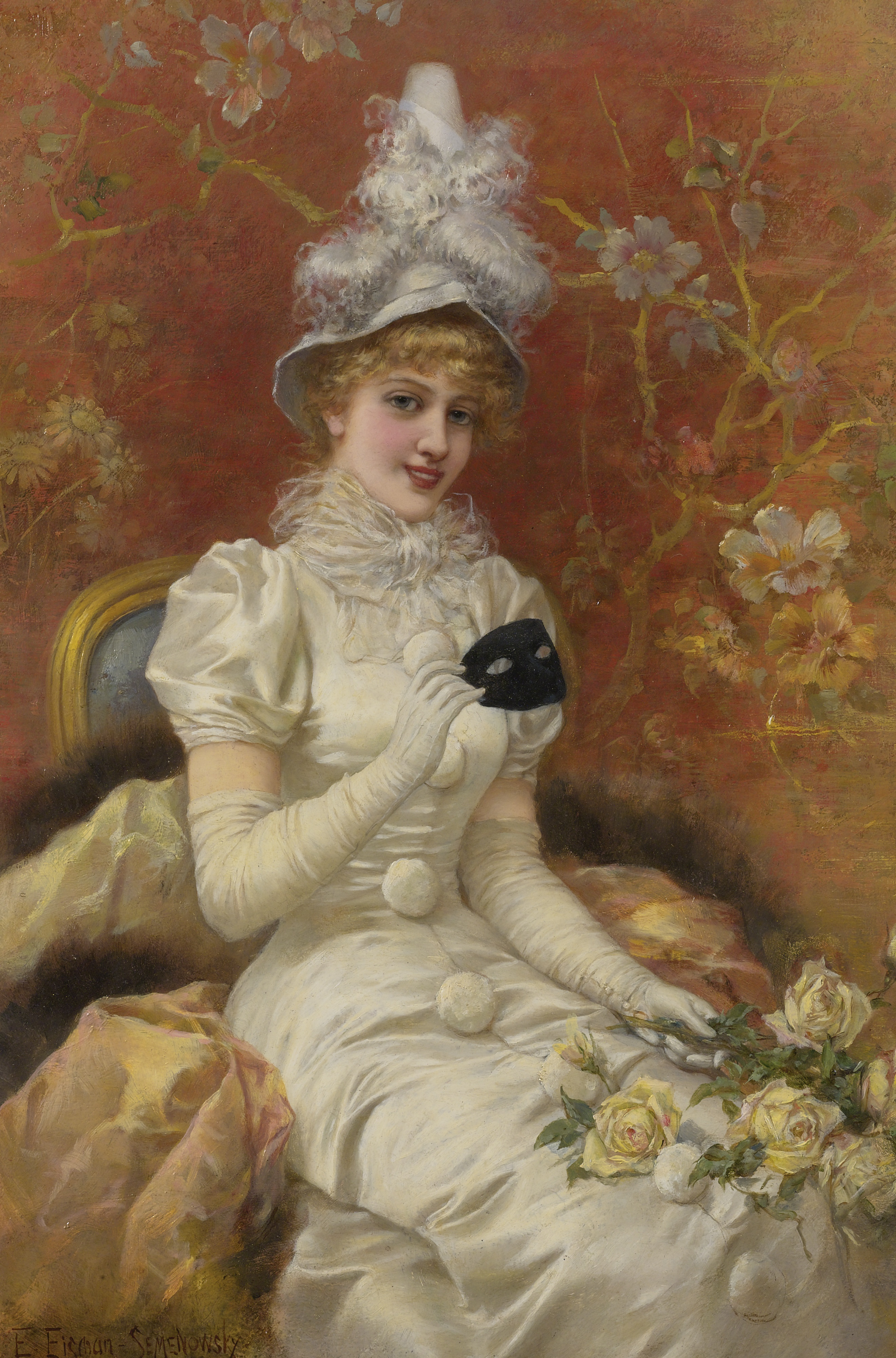
Beauty unmasked, 1911

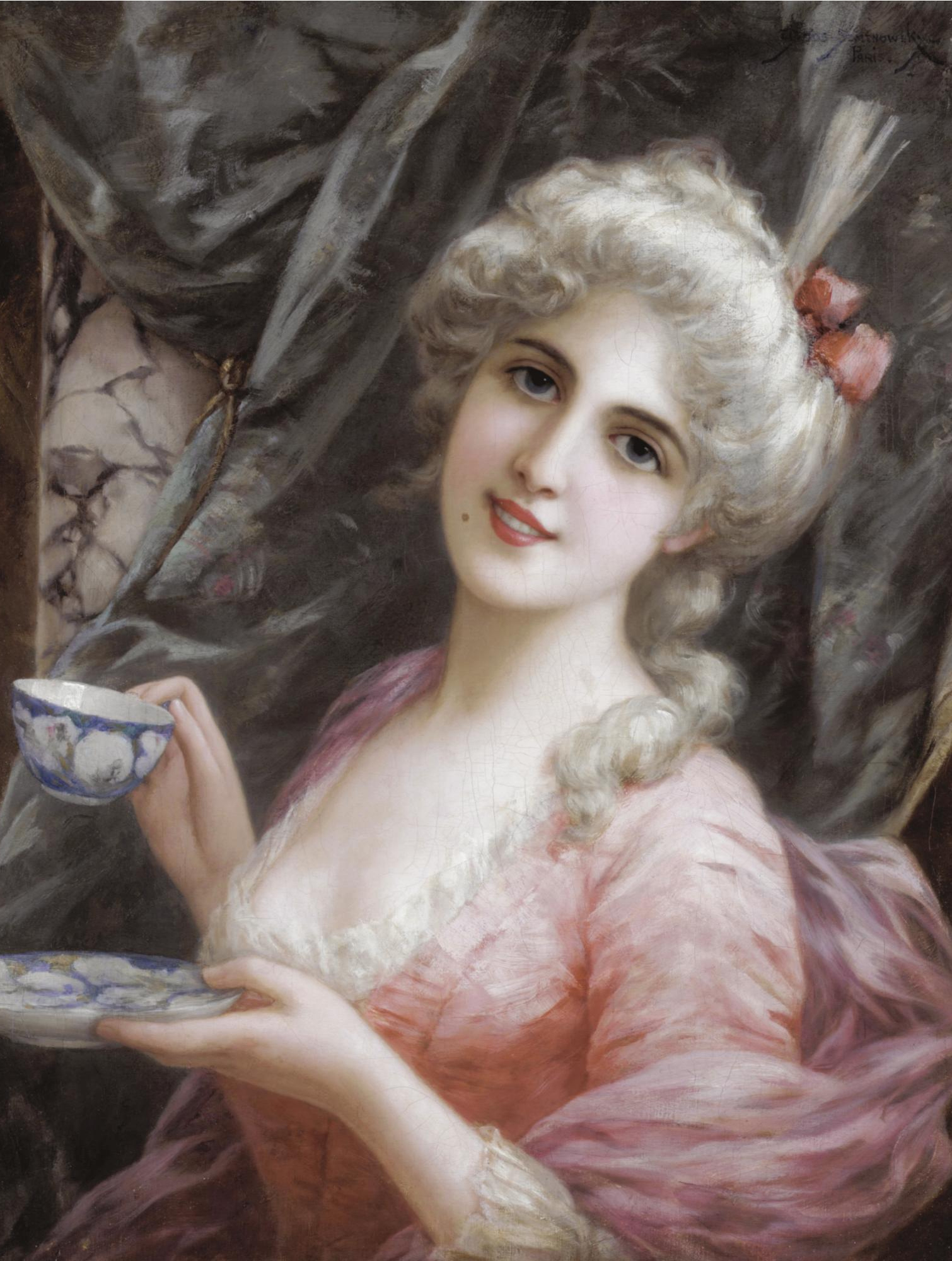
Tea time, 1900

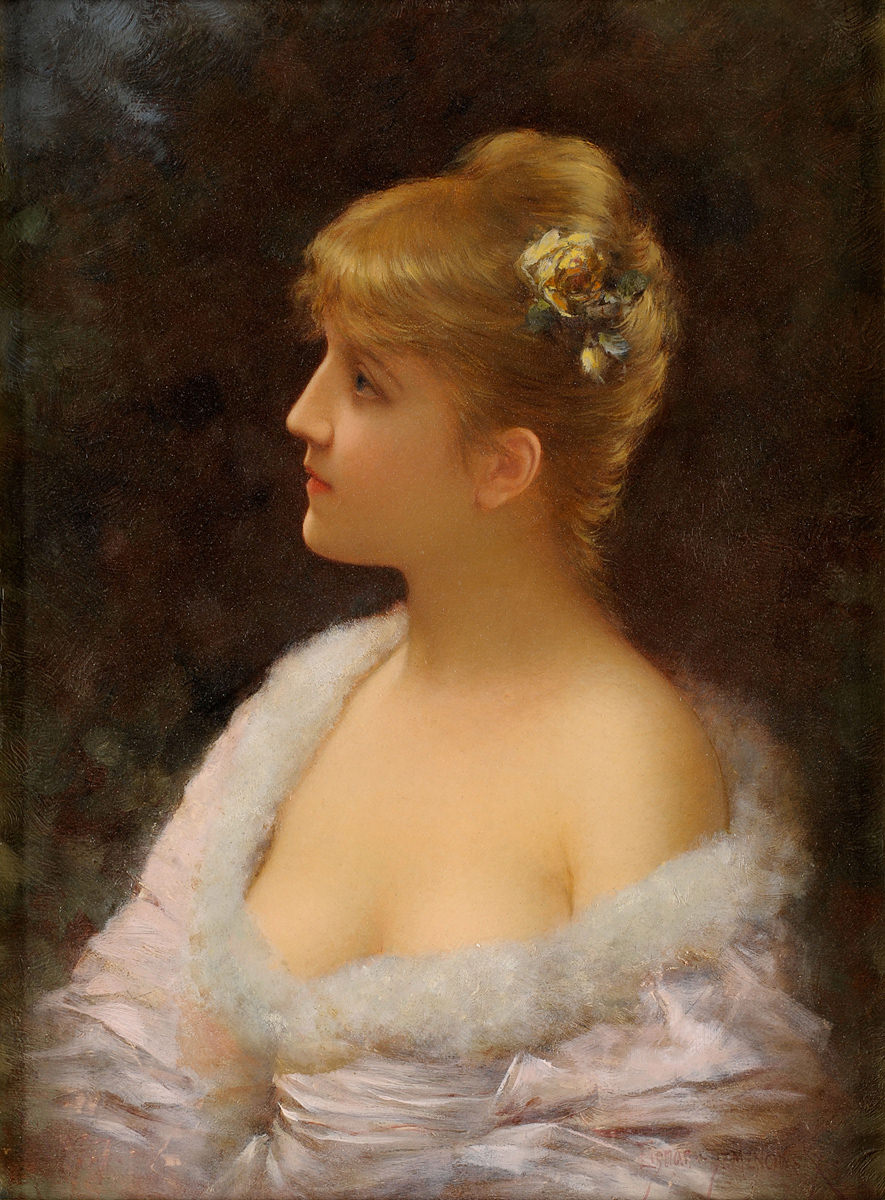
Young beauty, 1887
