= Max Schödl =

Austrian painter (1834–1921)

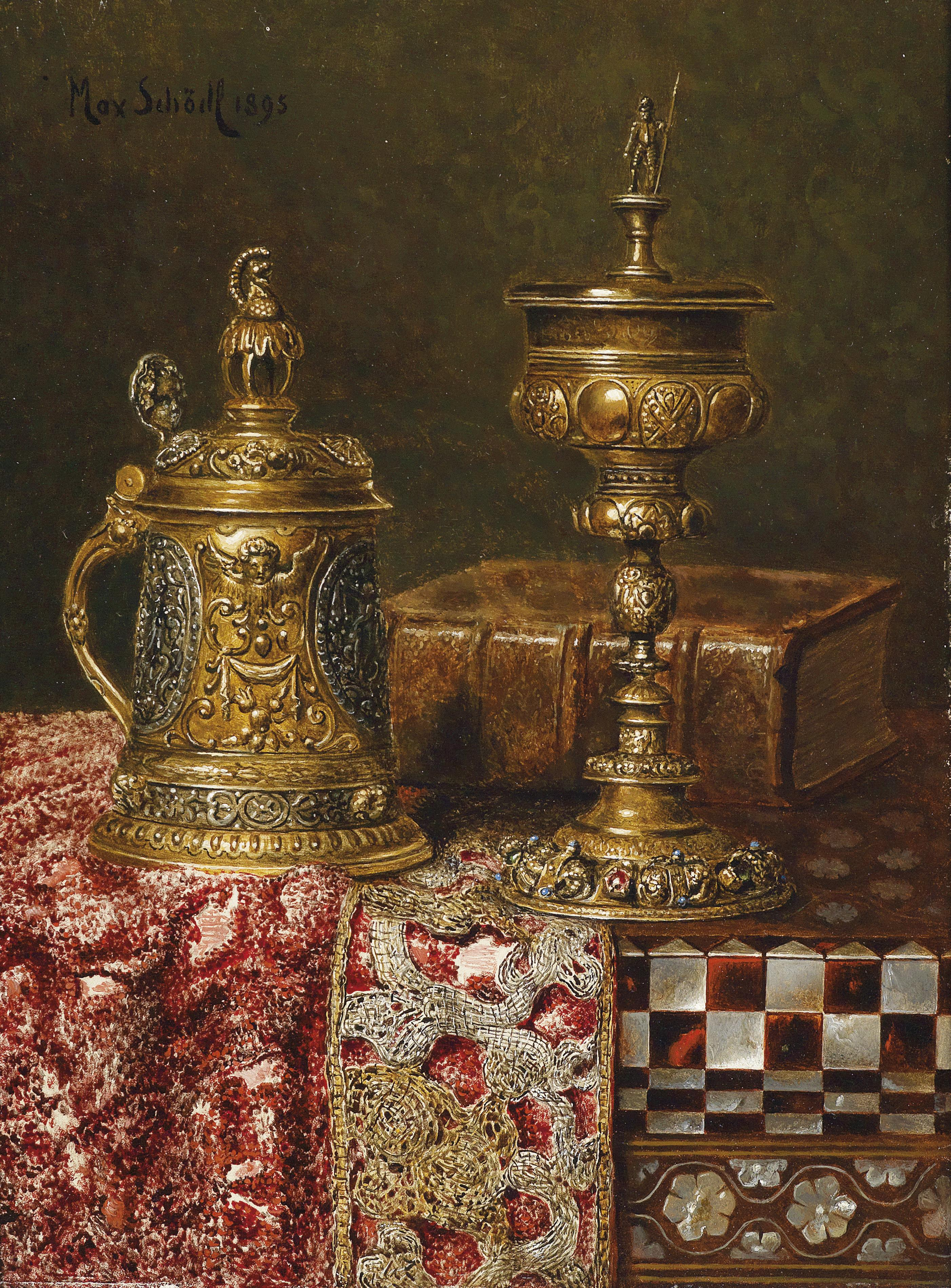
Max Schödl: Stillleben mit Prunkgefässen und einem Buch, 1895

Max Schödl (2 February 1834 – 23 March 1921, born and died in Vienna) was an Austrian painter known primarily for still life, mostly of art objects. He studied at the Academy of Fine Arts Vienna and was later associated with the Künstlerhaus as both a founding member and a benefactor.

His work is represented in the Wien Museum.
