= Gabriel Morcillo =

Spanish XX Century painter

Gabriel Morcillo Raya (Granada, 8 December 1887 - 22 December 1973), was a Spanish painter.

== Biography and works ==
He began his artistic training in the family environment in his aunt Paquita Raya's embroidery workshop and at the Granada School of Fine Arts, with Miguel Vico Hernández and José de Larrocha González as teachers. In 1907 he temporarily moved to Madrid to continue his studies as a disciple of Cecilio Plá, but for financial reasons he had to return to Granada. In 1910 he was awarded a grant from the Provincial Council of Granada that allowed him to continue his interrupted training in Madrid, the city where he remained until 1914.

After his return to Granada, he entered as an academic in: the Royal Academy of Fine Arts of San Fernando, the Royal Academy of Fine Arts of Granada and the Royal Academy of Fine Arts of Malaga. In 1918 he obtained a scholarship to the Academy of Painting in Rome, but he gave it up, initiating a period of atypical isolation for other painters in his class.

In 1927, by competitive examination to a position as professor of Decorative Painting and Natural Figure at the School of Arts and Crafts of Granada, which he had already been practicing as an interim professor since 1922.

His work is mainly composed of landscapes and portraits in which orientalism and sensuality have a great influence. He achieved great success in exhibitions held in New York, Buenos Aires or Venice.

Some of his canvases can be seen in the Museum of Fine Arts in Granada, such as the one entitled El enano de Puerto Real (1916).
