= Hans Hassenteufel =

German portrait painter

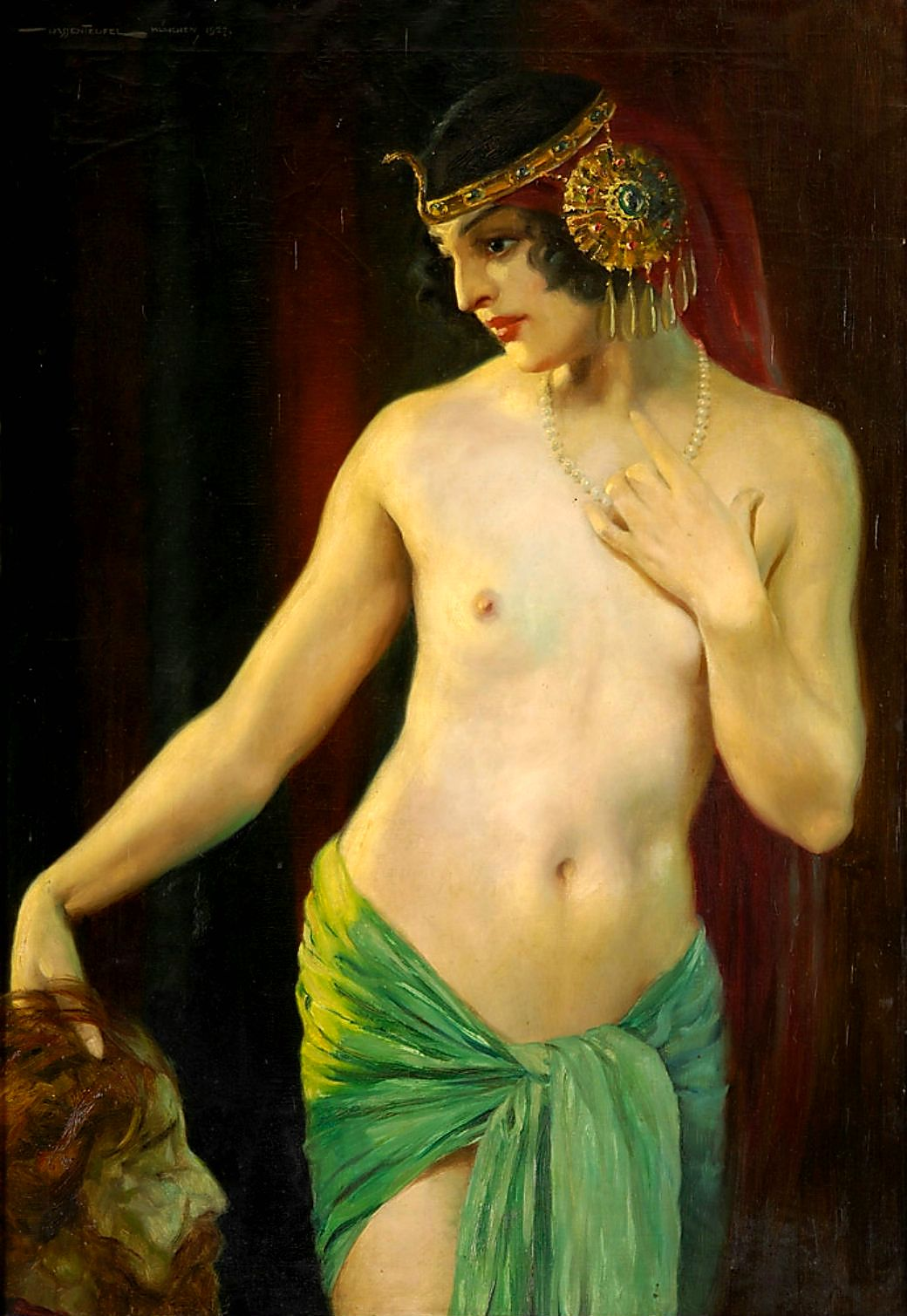
Salome

Hans Hassenteufel (27 January 1887 – 15 August 1943) was a German painter of portraits and female nudes.

== Life and work ==
He was born in Hamburg and took private lessons there from Rudolf Jacob Zeller, followed by studies at a private painting and drawing school in Munich, operated by Walter Thor; then at the Academy of Fine Arts, Munich, where his primary professors were Peter Halm and Franz von Stuck.

He remained in Munich throughout his subsequent career, creating an immense number of female portraits and nudes, many done in Orientalist style. He occasionally painted landscapes and still-lifes. Many of his works were published in the form of postcards. Hassenteufel died in Munich in 1943.

== Sources ==
- Hassenteufel, Hans. In: Hans Vollmer (Ed.): Allgemeines Lexikon der bildenden Künstler des XX. Jahrhunderts. Vol.2: E–J. E. A. Seemann, Leipzig 1955, p. 388
- Horst Ludwig: Münchner Maler im 19. Jahrhundert. Vol.5, Bruckmann, Munich 1993, ISBN 3-7654-1805-6 pg.350
