= Rafael Garzón =

Spanish photographer

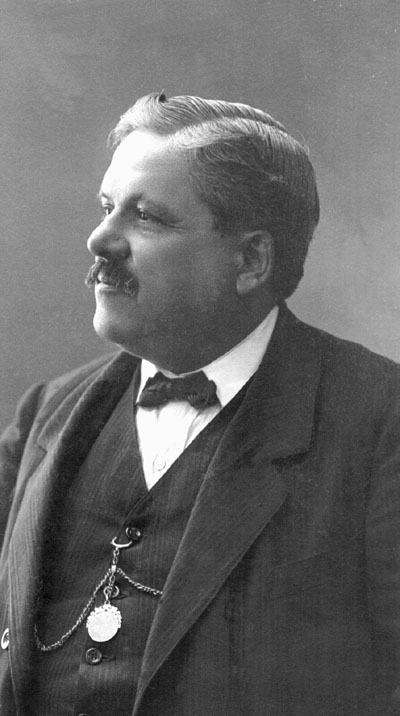
- Born: Rafael Garzón Rodríguez; 1863; Granada, Spain
- Died: 1923 (aged 59–60); Granada, Spain
- Known for: Photographer, illustrator
- Movement: Orientalist; Costumbrista
- Website: Rafael Garzón

Rafael Garzón was a Spanish photographer born in Granada in 1863 and died in 1923. His studio was in operation until 1935.

He held studios in:

- Calle Triunfo 127, Córdoba. The name of this studio was Estudio fotográfico Hispano-árabe Casa del Califa
- Calle Alhambra 24, Granada (inside the Alhambra of Granada).
- Calle Mendez Nuñez 5, Seville.

== Career ==
He recorded with his camera the landscapes and monuments of Andalucía. He became famous because of his photographic portraits made in his studio inside The Alhambra. His photographs illustrated the Commercial Guide of Granada.

In Seville, where he arrived in 1901, he hold a studio with a sumptuous Arabic scenery in order to use it for his photographs.

He made portraits of the aristocracy of Seville and also of the first tourists of the 19th century who used to travel to Andalucía. This is why his photographs are spread outside Spain too. He also made albums and postcards of monuments of Seville.

== Work ==
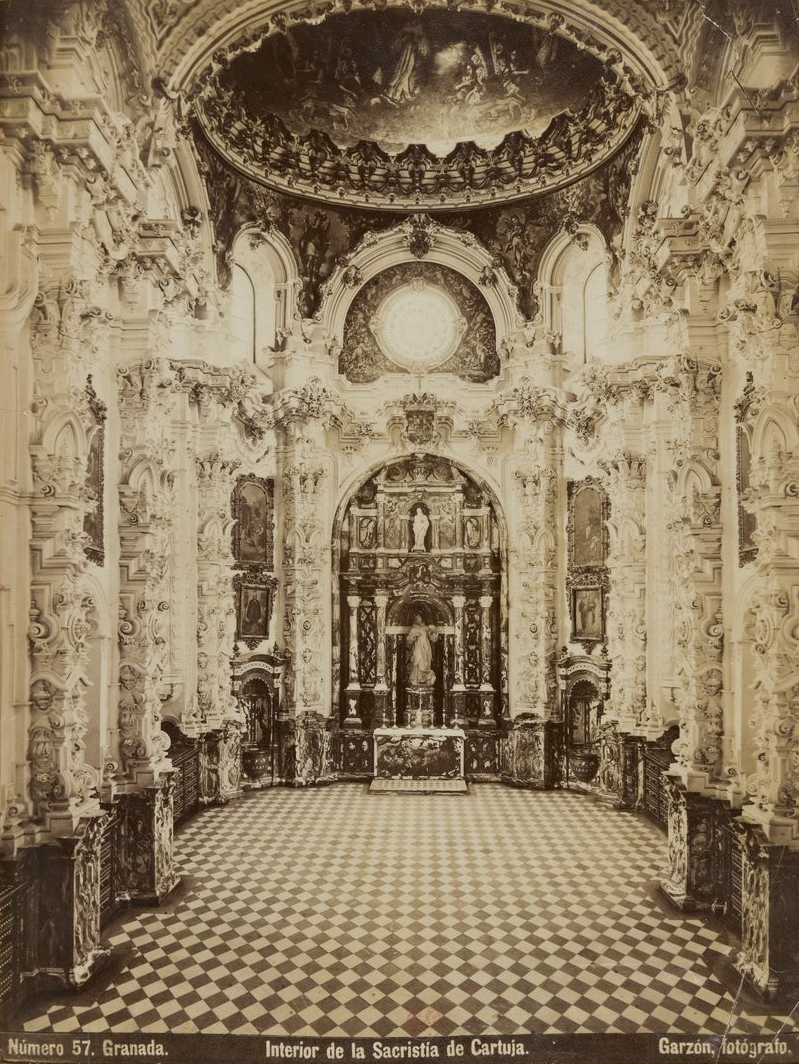
Cartuja de Granada

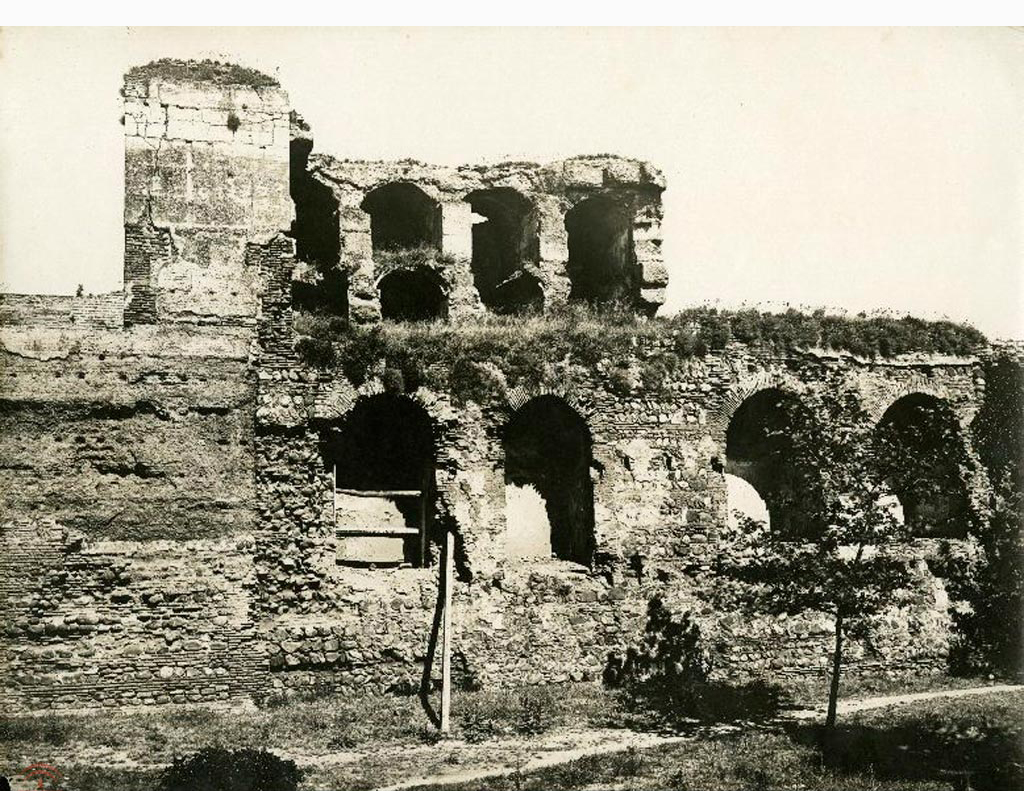
Garzón's photograph of the Alhambra

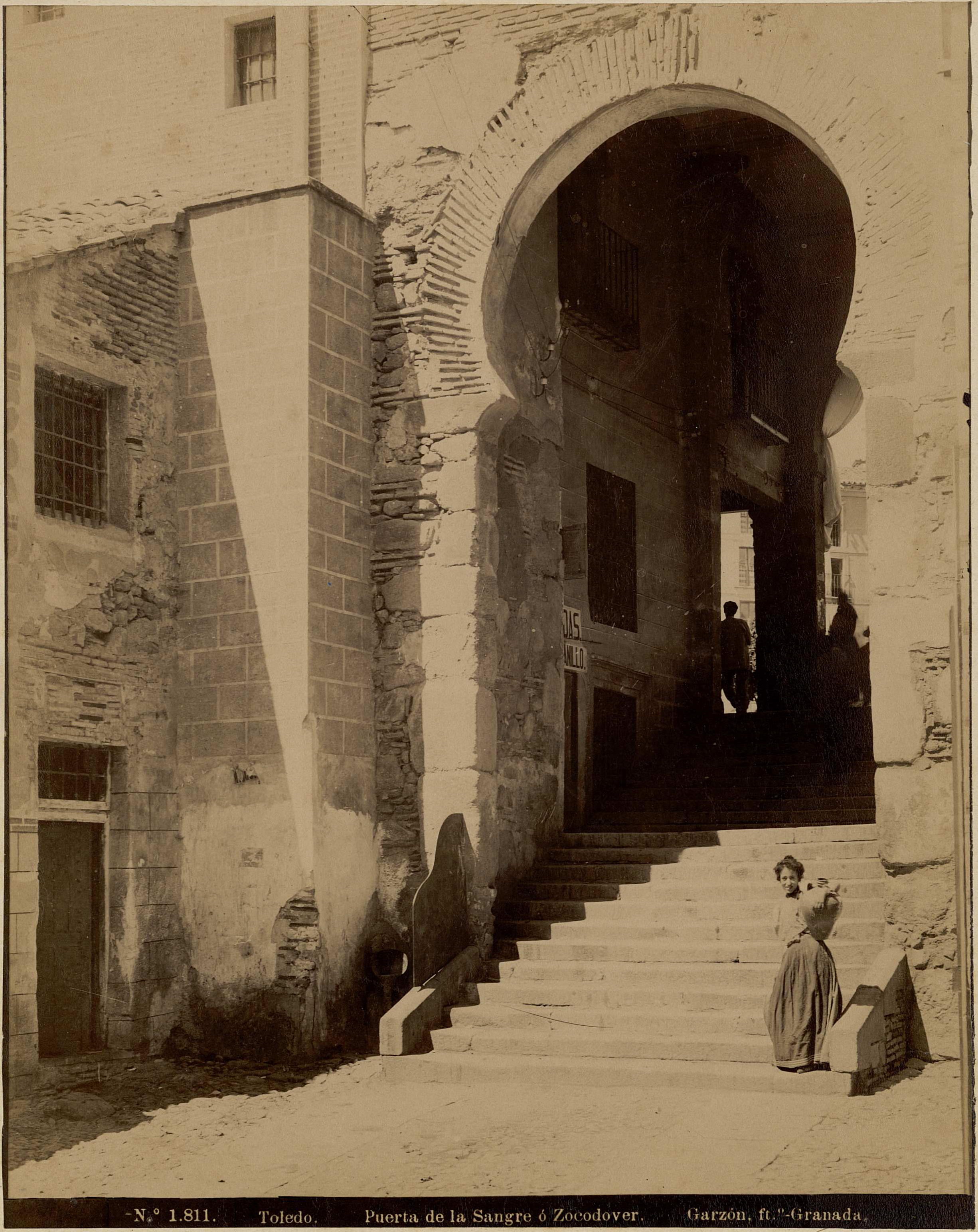
Puerta de la Sangre o Zocodover, Toledo, de Garzón

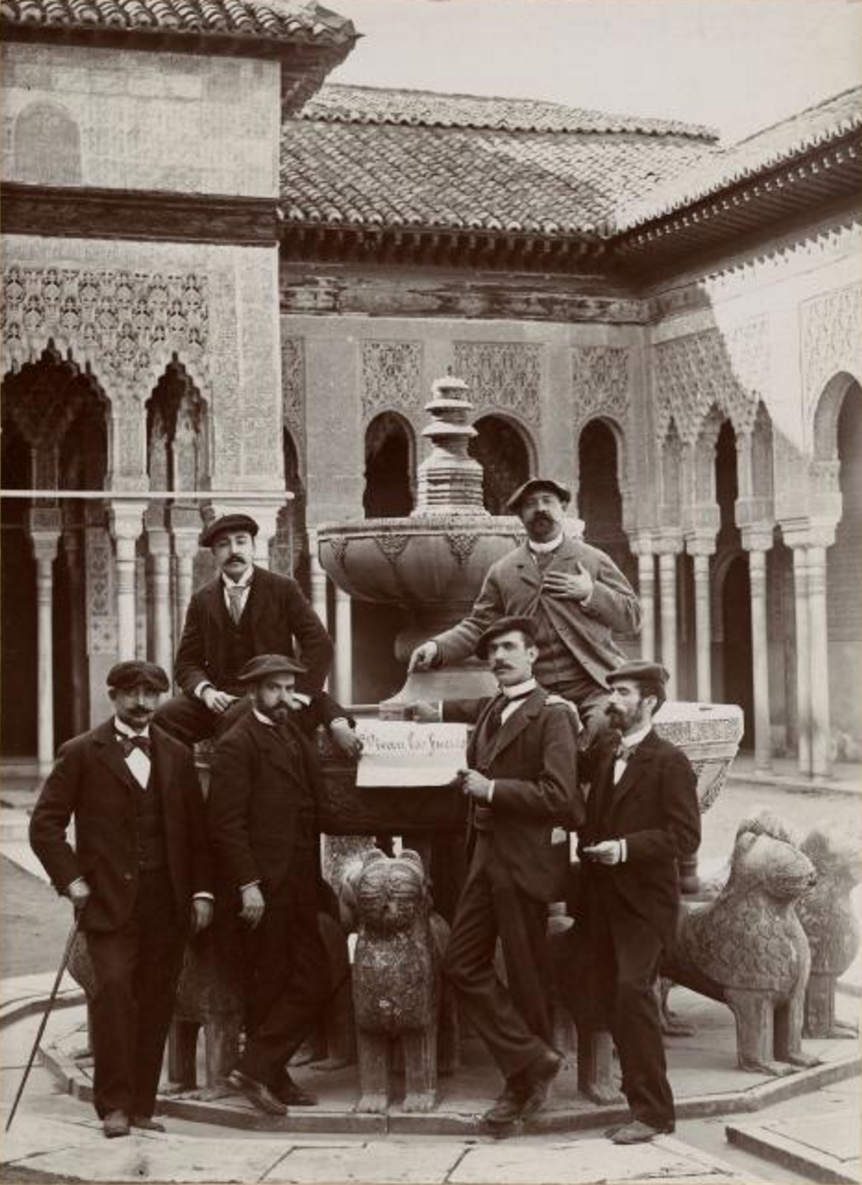
Carlistas en Granada 1894
