= Adolphe Aze =

French painter (1823–1884)

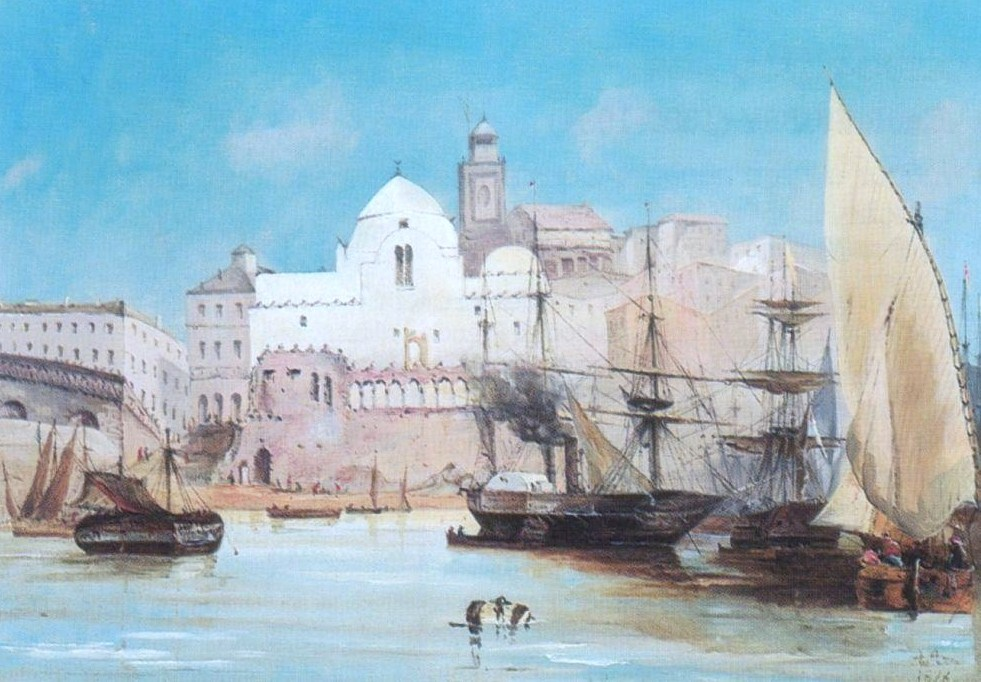
Ships in the Port of Algiers

Valère Adolphe Louis Aze (4 March 1823, Paris – 19 March 1884, Paris) was a French painter; specializing in historical and Orientalist themes.

== Life and work ==
He was a student of the history painter, Joseph-Nicolas Robert-Fleury.

He is remembered primarily for his paintings and sketches of Egypt, Istanbul and Algeria; done in oils, watercolors and pencil.

His burial place is in the Cimetière Montmartre, 22nd division, in the chapel of the Léger family, with his wife Blanche-Marie Léger and her relatives.

Among his best known works are; "Diana Surprised by Endymion", "Giovanni Bellini Drawing in the Streets of Venice" and "Philip II Meeting with his Son, Don Carlos".
