= Manuel García y Rodríguez =

Spanish painter (1863–1925)

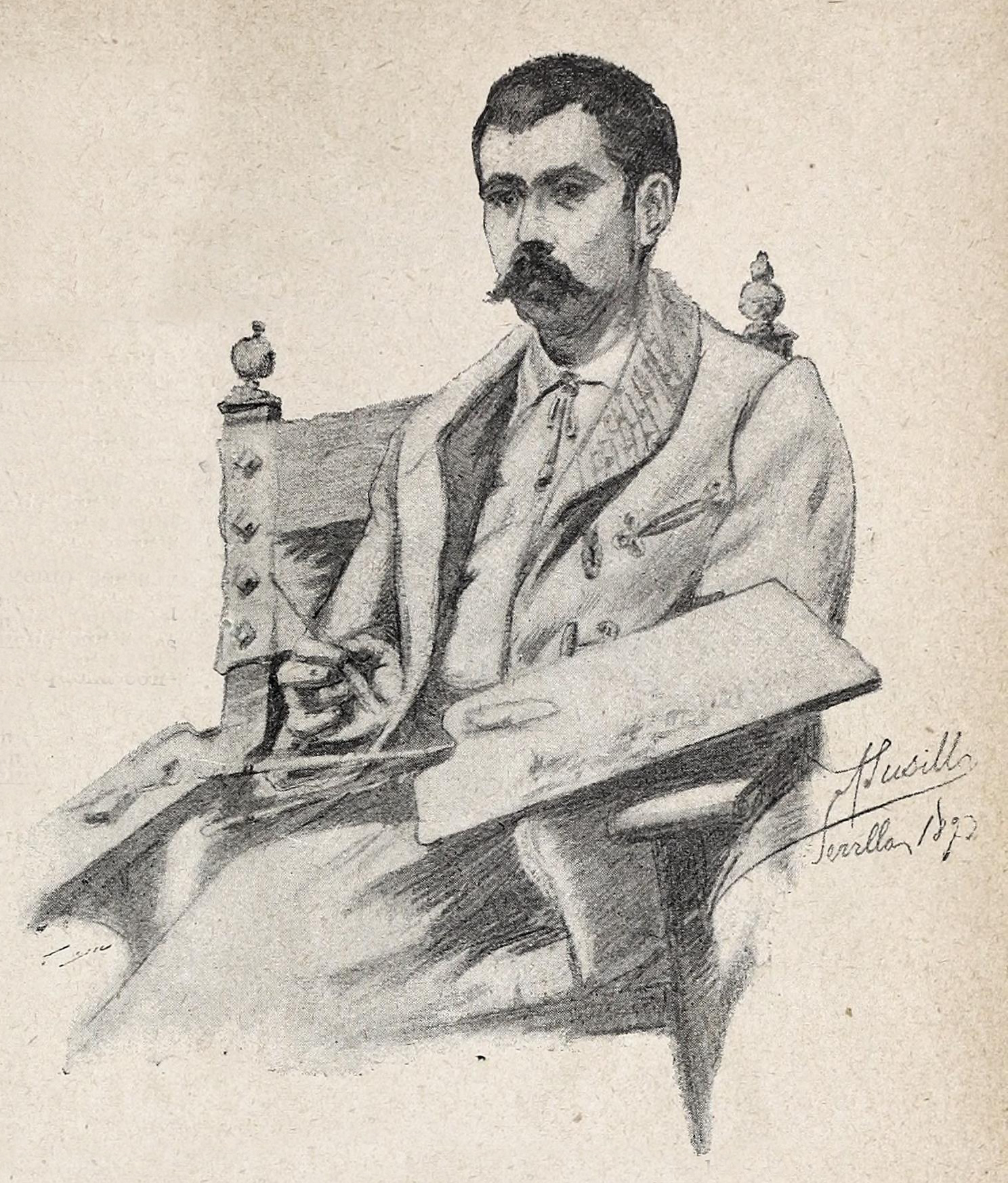
- Born: 1863; Seville, Spain
- Died: 6 May 1925 (aged 61–62); Seville, Spain
- Education: José de la Vega Marrugal, Seville; School of Fine Arts, Seville
- Known for: Painter
- Movement: Orientalist; costumbrista

Manuel García y Rodríguez (1863, Seville - 6 May 1925, Seville) was a Spanish costumbrista and landscape painter, who also painted Orientalist scenes.

== Biography ==
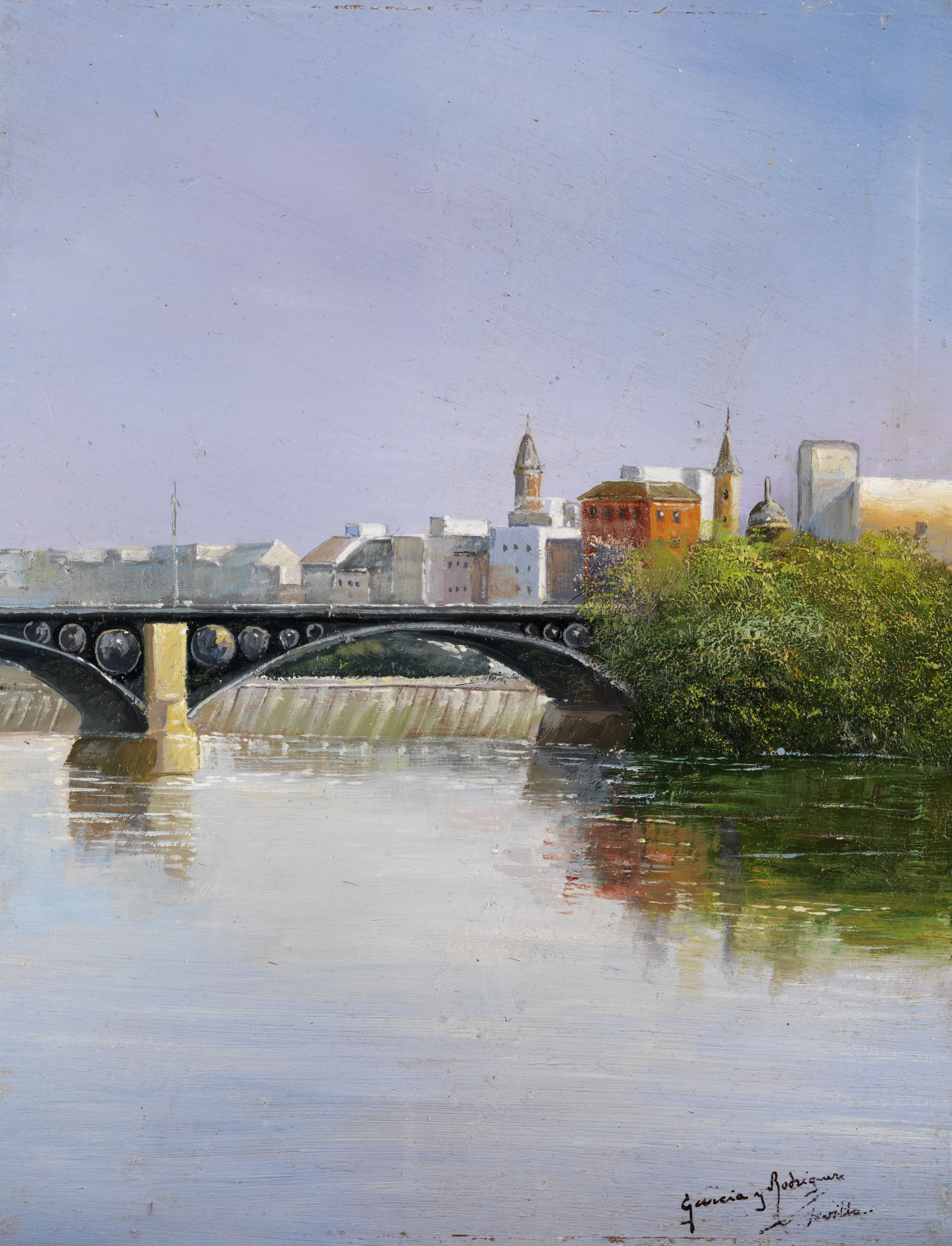
Bridge in Seville

At first, he studied music but ultimately dedicated himself to his love of painting. He received his earliest art education from José de la Vega Marrugal in Seville. Later, he attended the Escuela de Bellas Artes de Sevilla, where he studied with Eduardo Cano, Manuel Ussel de Guimbarda and Emilio Sánchez Perrier.

Throughout his life, he participated in the National Exhibition of Fine Arts, where he was awarded medals in 1887, 1890 and 1895. He also participated in the Exposition Universelle (1889) and the World's Columbian Exposition. In 1899, he was named a member of the Real Academia de Bellas Artes de San Fernando.

In 1904, he visited Tangier and produced some paintings in Orientalist style. His works are in numerous museums (including the Carmen Thyssen Museum) and private collections. He was also a regular contributor of illustrations for the magazine Blanco y Negro.

He took much of his inspiration from the city of Seville and the Guadalquivir, including the Guadaira rivers and surrounding areas. He was closely associated with the Alcalá de Guadaira school of painting. In his final years, he focussed on the gardens, patios and parks of Seville, at which time he developed more of a modernist and impressionist aesthetic.

== Work ==
García's work remains well known because many of his landscapes were reproduced as black and white illustrations, postcards and posters. Example of his work can be found in the Museum of Fine Arts in Seville. Many of his paintings are now in private collections, such as the Bellver Collection.

List of selected paintings

- A Morning Stroll by the Canal, 1904
- Patio with Children, 1906
- Alcazar de Sevilla, 1911
- A River Landscape with Seville Beyond, 1912
- A Garden in Seville, 1913
- Seville Garden, 1914
- The Borders of Guadalquivir, 1917
- A Garden in Seville, 1919
- Collecion Bay, Madrid, 1921
- The Rose Garden, 1921
- Seville Patio, 1925
- At the Well
- A Courtyard in Seville
- Easter Procession in Mateos Gago Street, Seville
- Feeding Poultry in a Courtyard
- The Gardens of the Alcazar of Seville
- Mother and Daughter Sewing in a Patio
- Mujer con guitarra, (Woman with Guitar)
- Musician in an Andalusian Palace
- Inside Courtyard, Seville
- Street scene in Granada

== Gallery ==
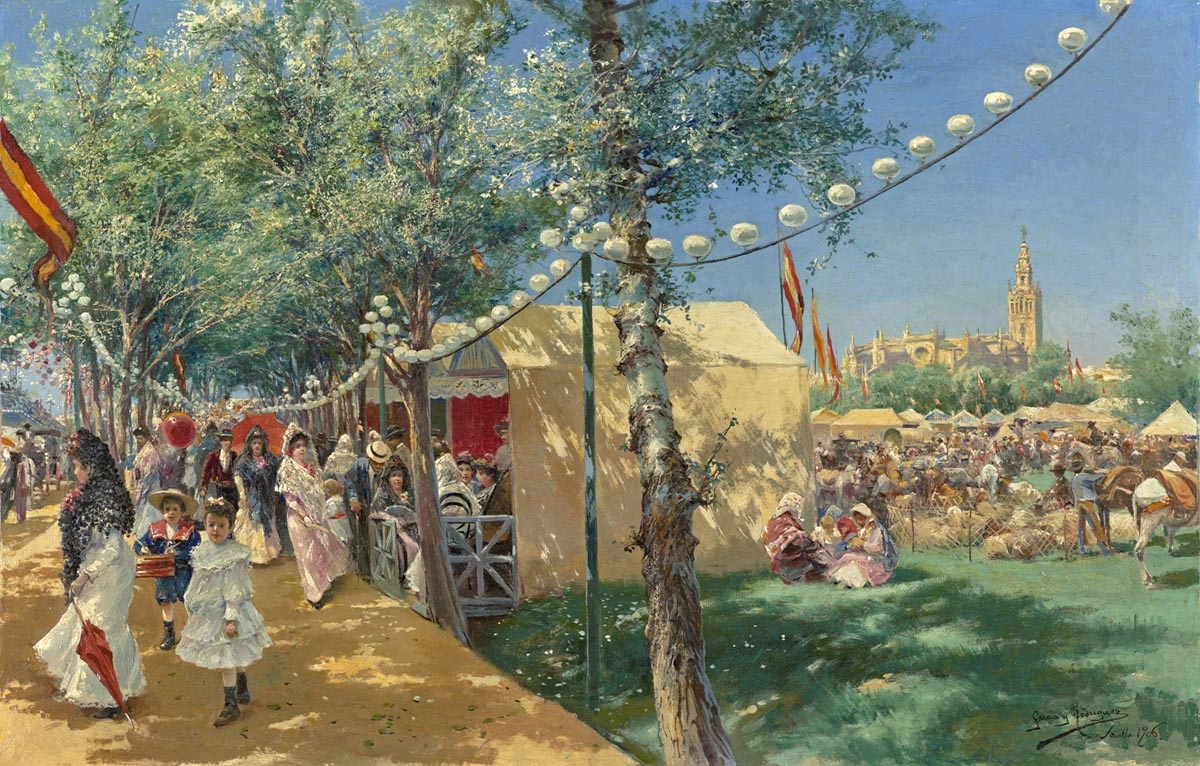
Festival in Seville (1906)

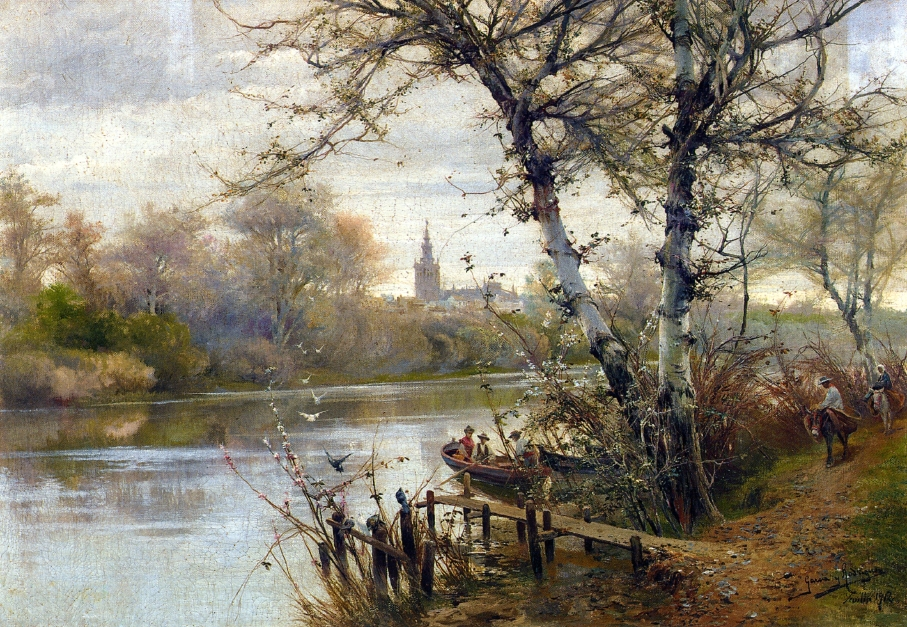
A River Landscape with Seville Beyond (1912)

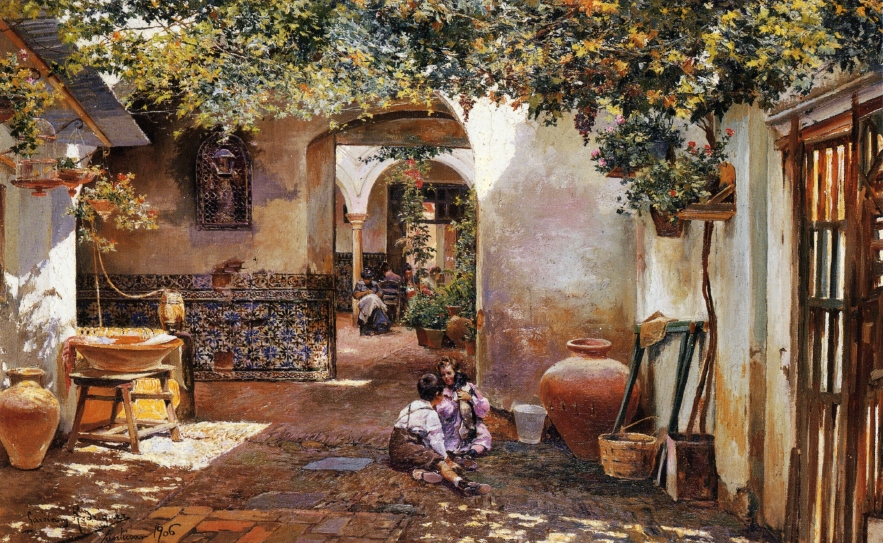
Patio with Children (1906)

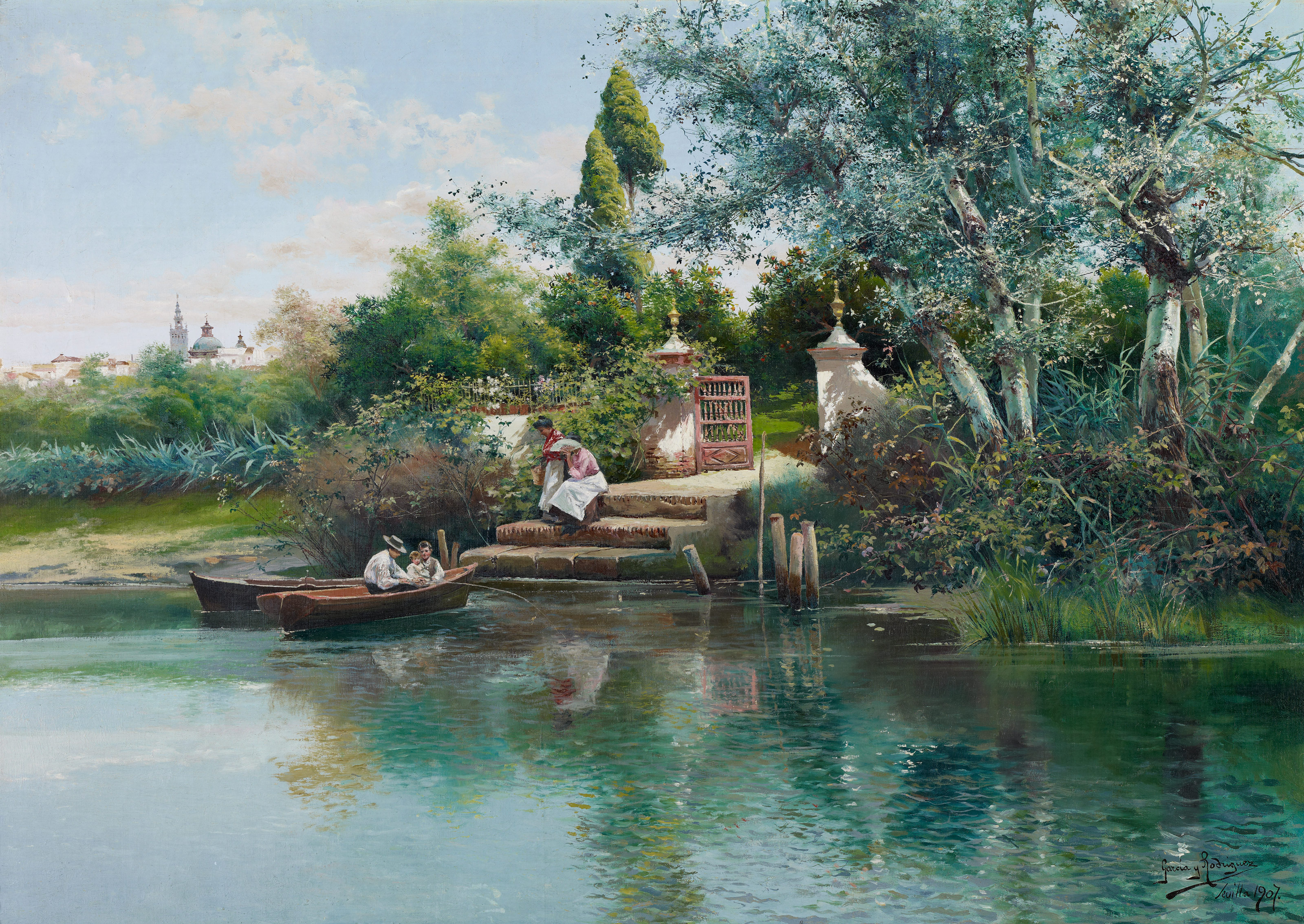
Fishing (1907)

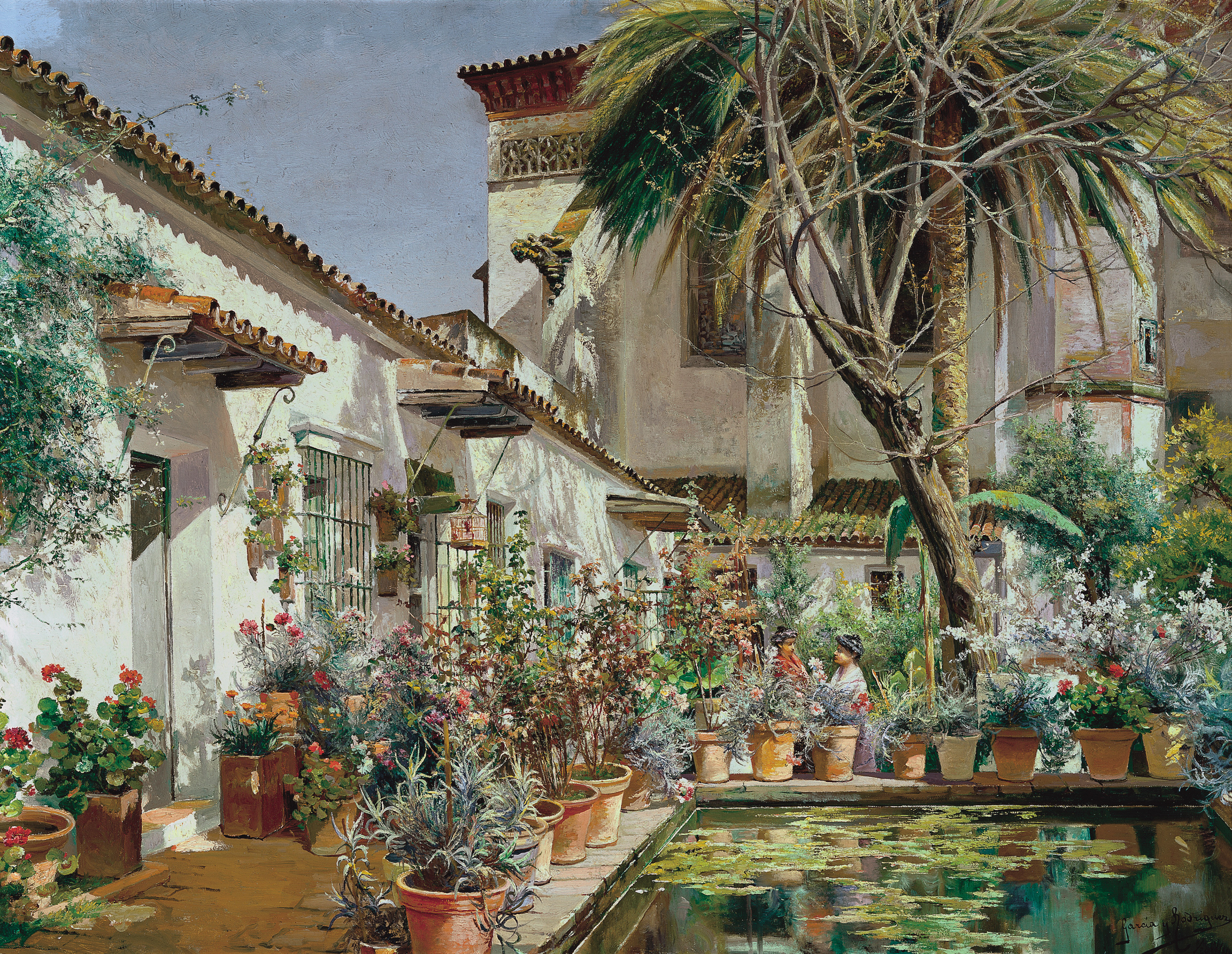
First Atrium of Santa Paula Convent, Seville (1920–27) Museo Carmen Thyssen

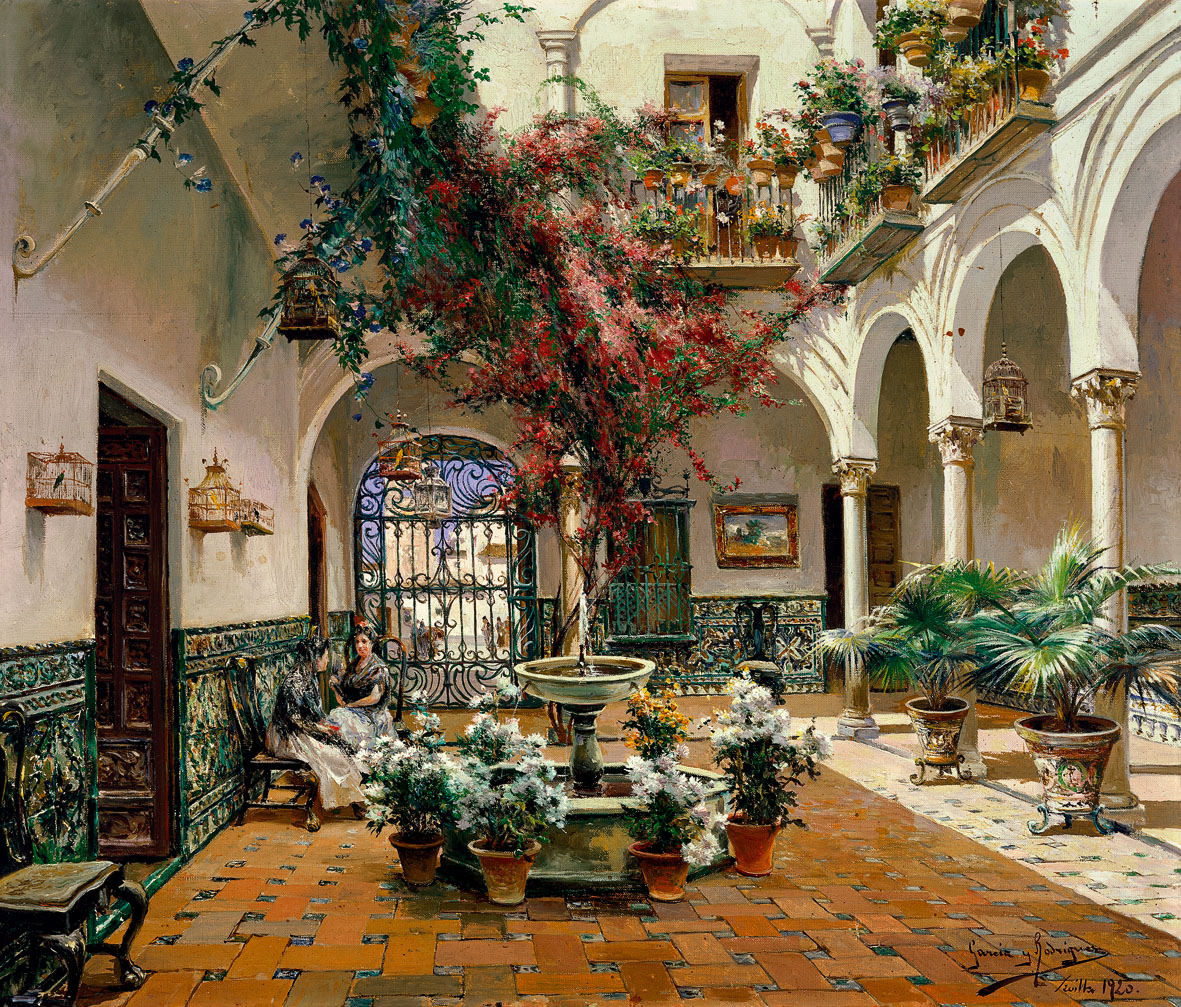
Interior Courtyard, Seville (1920) Museo Carmen Thyssen

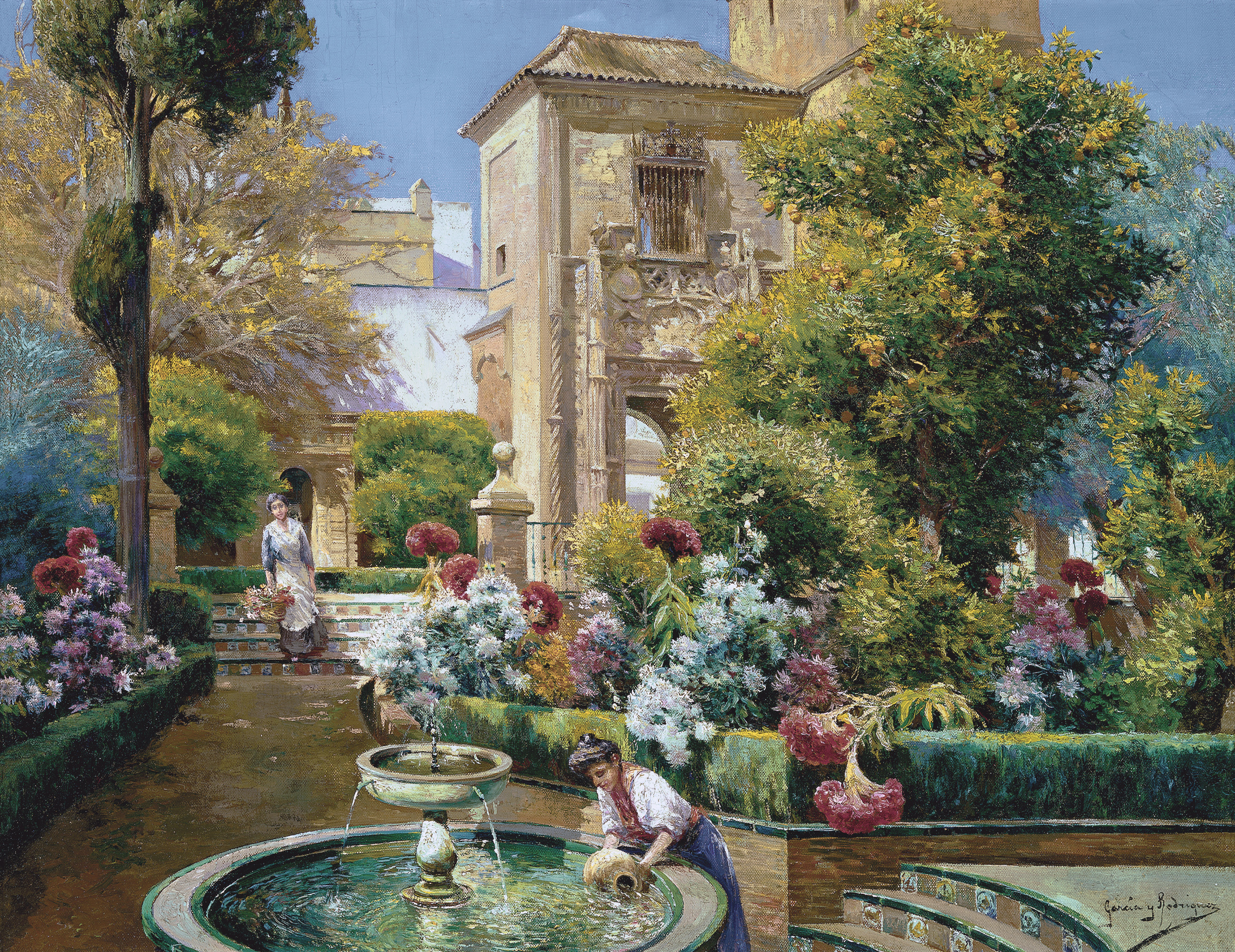
The Garden of the Alcázar, Sevilla (1920–25) Museo Carmen Thyssen

== See also ==
- List of Orientalist artists
- Orientalism
