= Carmen Thyssen Museum =

Coordinates: 36°43′17″N 4°25′22″W

Museo Carmen Thyssen
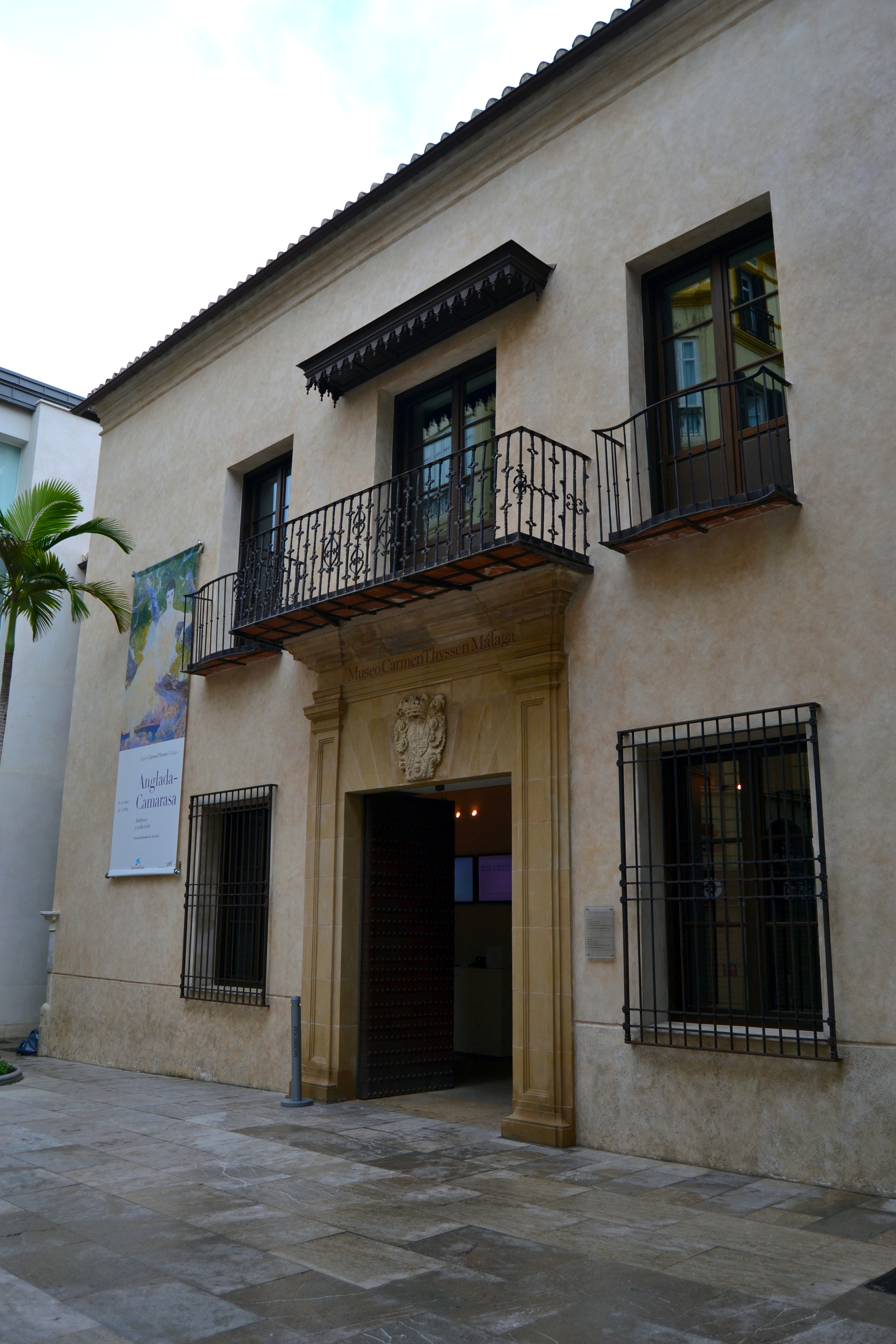
- Established: 2011
- Location: Calle Compañía, Málaga, Spain
- Type: Art museum
- Director: Lourdes Moreno
- Website: www.carmenthyssenmalaga.org/en (English version)

The Carmen Thyssen Museum (Museo Carmen Thyssen Málaga) is an art museum in the Spanish city Málaga. The main focus of the museum is 19th-century Spanish painting, predominantly Andalusian, based on the collection of Carmen Cervera, fifth wife of Baron Hans Heinrich Thyssen-Bornemisza.

Since 1992 the Thyssen family's art collection has been on display at the Thyssen-Bornemisza Museum in Madrid. However, Carmen Thyssen has been an art collector in her own right since the 1980s, and her personal collection is shown separately. In 1999, she agreed to display many items from her collection in the Thyssen-Bornemisza Museum for a period of twelve years. Meanwhile, a home for her collection was sought in Málaga. This museum, a conversion of a sixteenth-century building, opened to the public on 24 March 2011.

== Building ==
The purpose-built museum was developed by RG Arquitectos Asociados around the 16th century Baroque Palacio de Villalón, which was partly reconstructed on this occasion. The exhibition spaces, three rooms for the permanent collection and two for temporary exhibitions, were newly built next to the palace, which houses the Old Masters collection. Overall, the museum covers 7,147 square metres, of which 5,185 can be used to display art.

Excavations, which took place since 2005, have uncovered significant Roman-era remains, revealing the site's continuous occupation from the 1st to the 5th century AD. Located northwest of the Roman city of Malaca, the area housed a suburban villa with domestic, industrial (a fish-salting factory), and commercial spaces. Interesting discoveries include a monumental fountain, likely a nymphaeum, decorated with wall paintings of fish, along with geometric mosaics, ceramics, coins, and remnants of a bronze sculpture. After periods of abandonment, the site saw a brief revival in the 5th century for fish production before becoming a necropolis during the Byzantine era.

== Highlights of the collection ==
- Niccolò Frangipane, Penitent, 1574
- Francisco de Zurbarán, Saint Marina, c. 1640-1650
- Alfred Dehodencq, A Confraternity in Procession along Calle Génova, 1851
- Marià Fortuny, Bullfight. Wounded Picador, c. 1867
- Manuel Ussel de Guimbarda, Rosquillo Sellers in Seville, 1881
- Guillermo Gómez Gil, The Reding Fountain; By the Fountain, c.1880-1885
- Raimundo Madrazo, Leaving the Masked Ball, c. 1885
- Martín Rico Ortega, A Summer's Day on the Seine, 1870-1875
- Emilio Sánchez-Perrier, Winter in Andalusia, c. 1880
- Ignacio Zuloaga, Bullfight at Éibar, 1899
- Darío de Regoyos, The Concha, Night-time, 1906
- Francisco Iturrino, The Bath (Seville), 1908
- Ramon Casas i Carbó, Julia, 1915
- Julio Romero de Torres, La Buenaventura, 1922

== Gallery ==
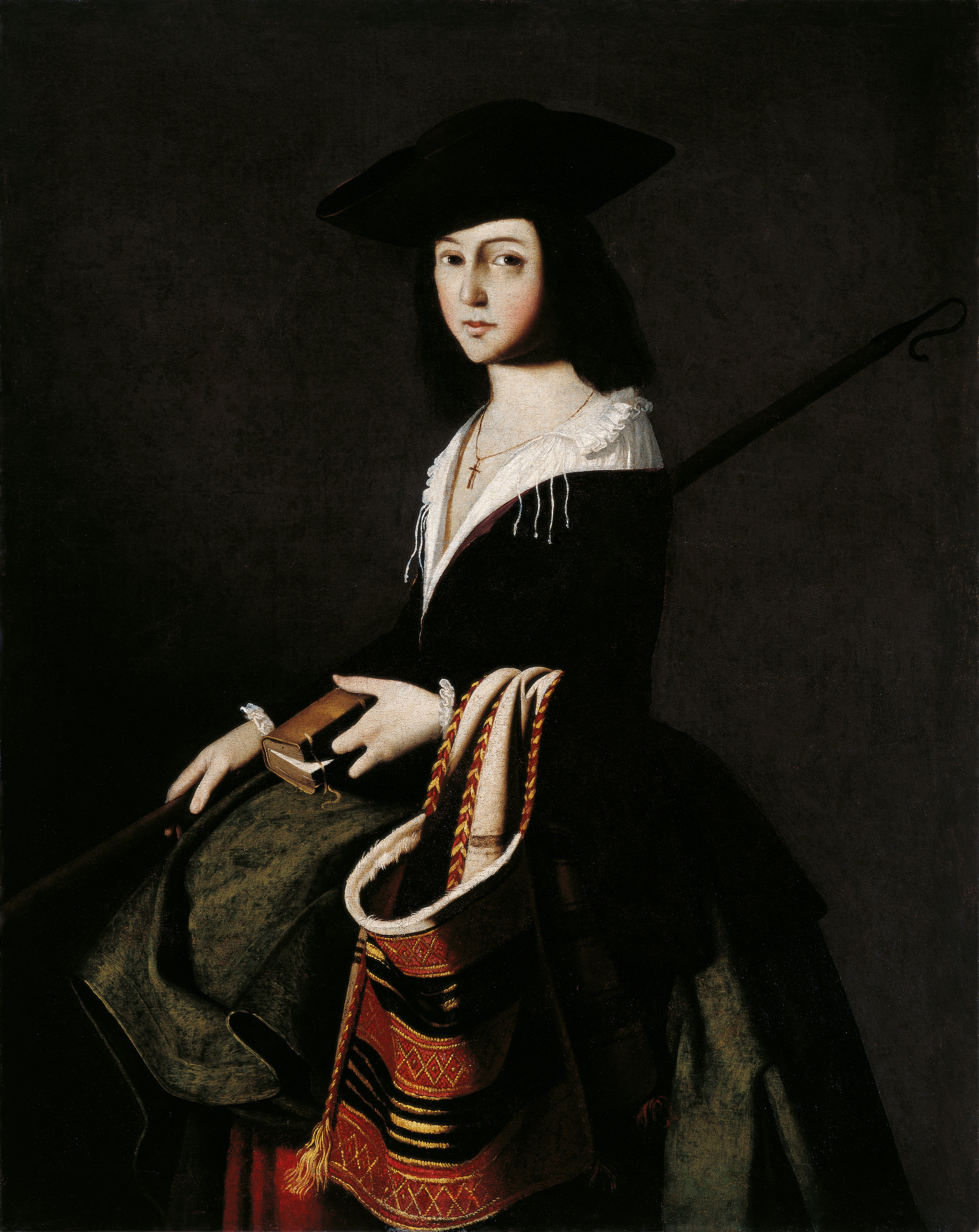
Saint Marina by Francisco de Zurbarán, 1640-1650

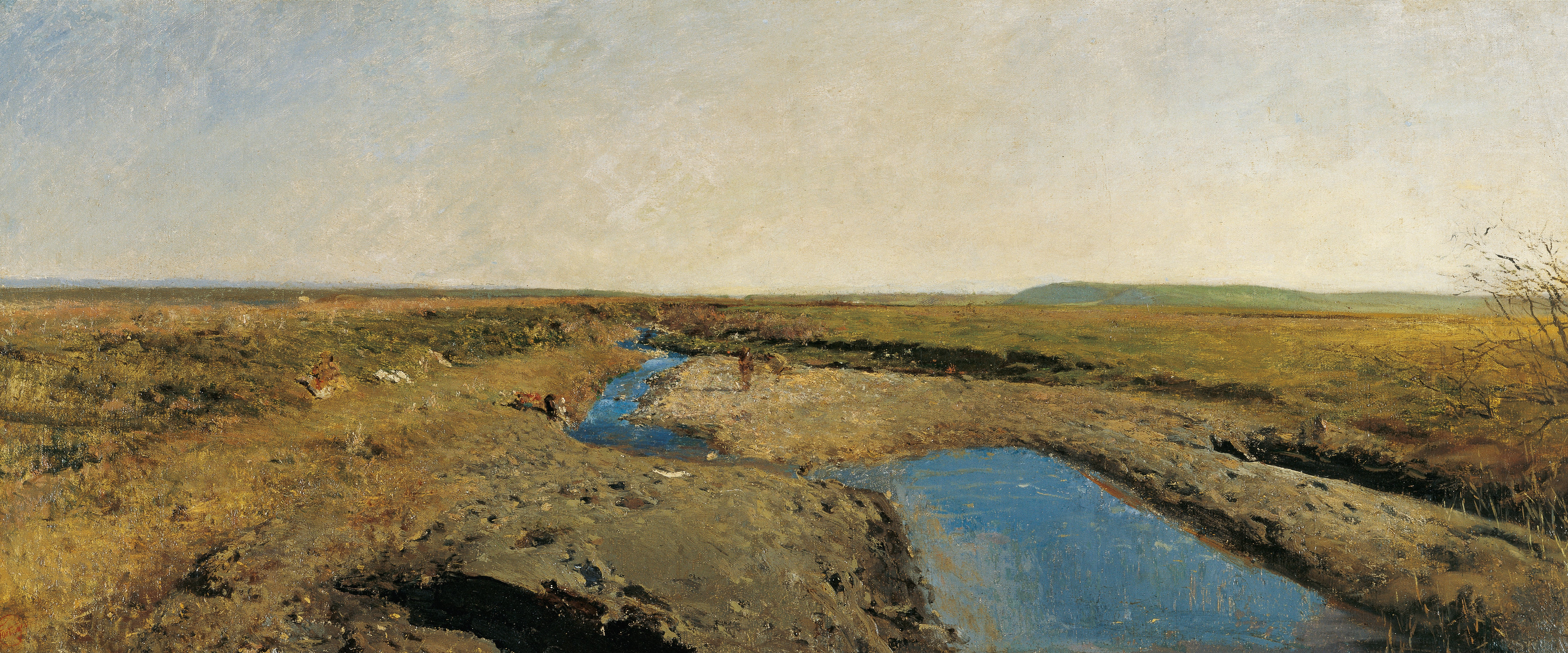
North African Landscape by Marià Fortuny, 1862

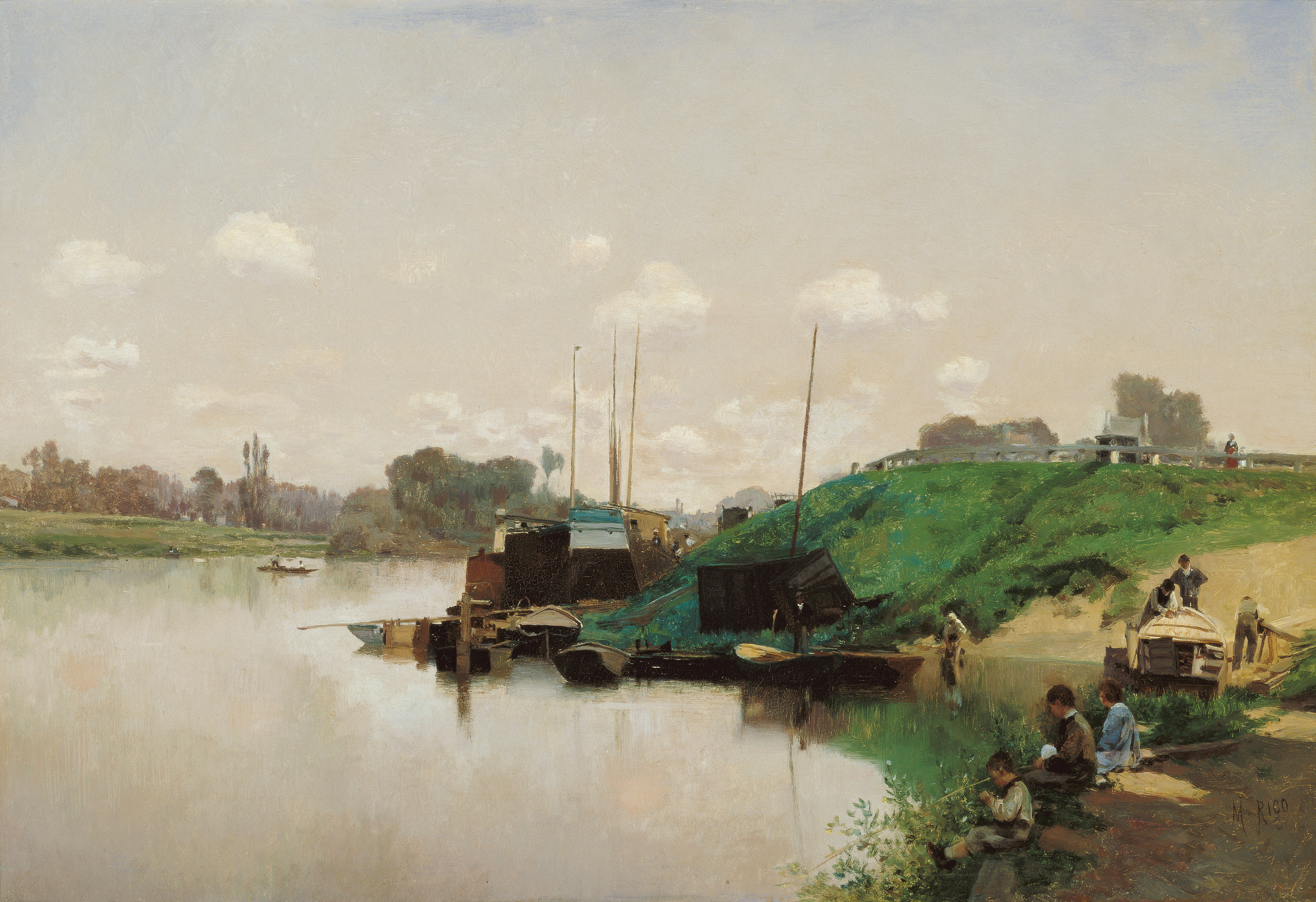
A Summer's Day on the Seine by Martín Rico Ortega, 1870-1875

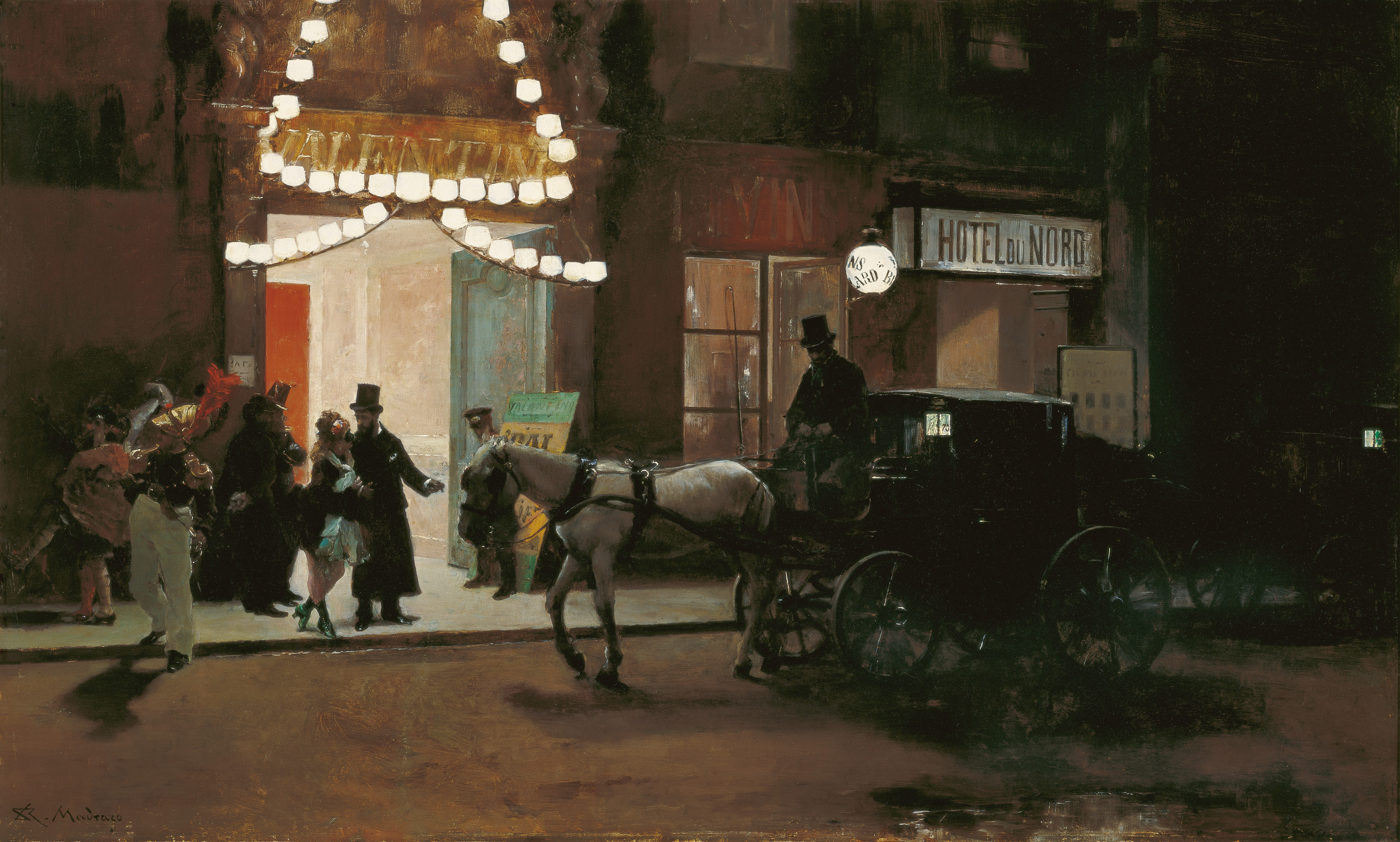
Leaving the Masked Ball by Raimundo Madrazo, c. 1885

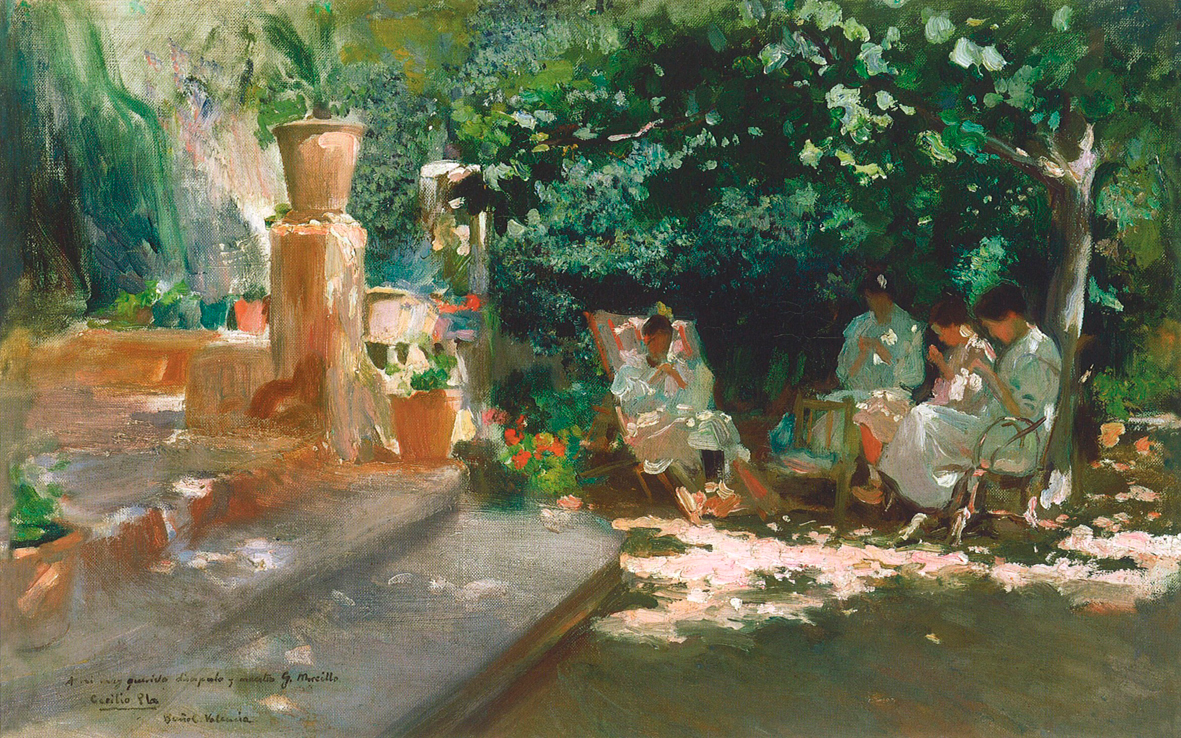
Ladies in the Garden by Cecilio Plá y Gallardo, c. 1910

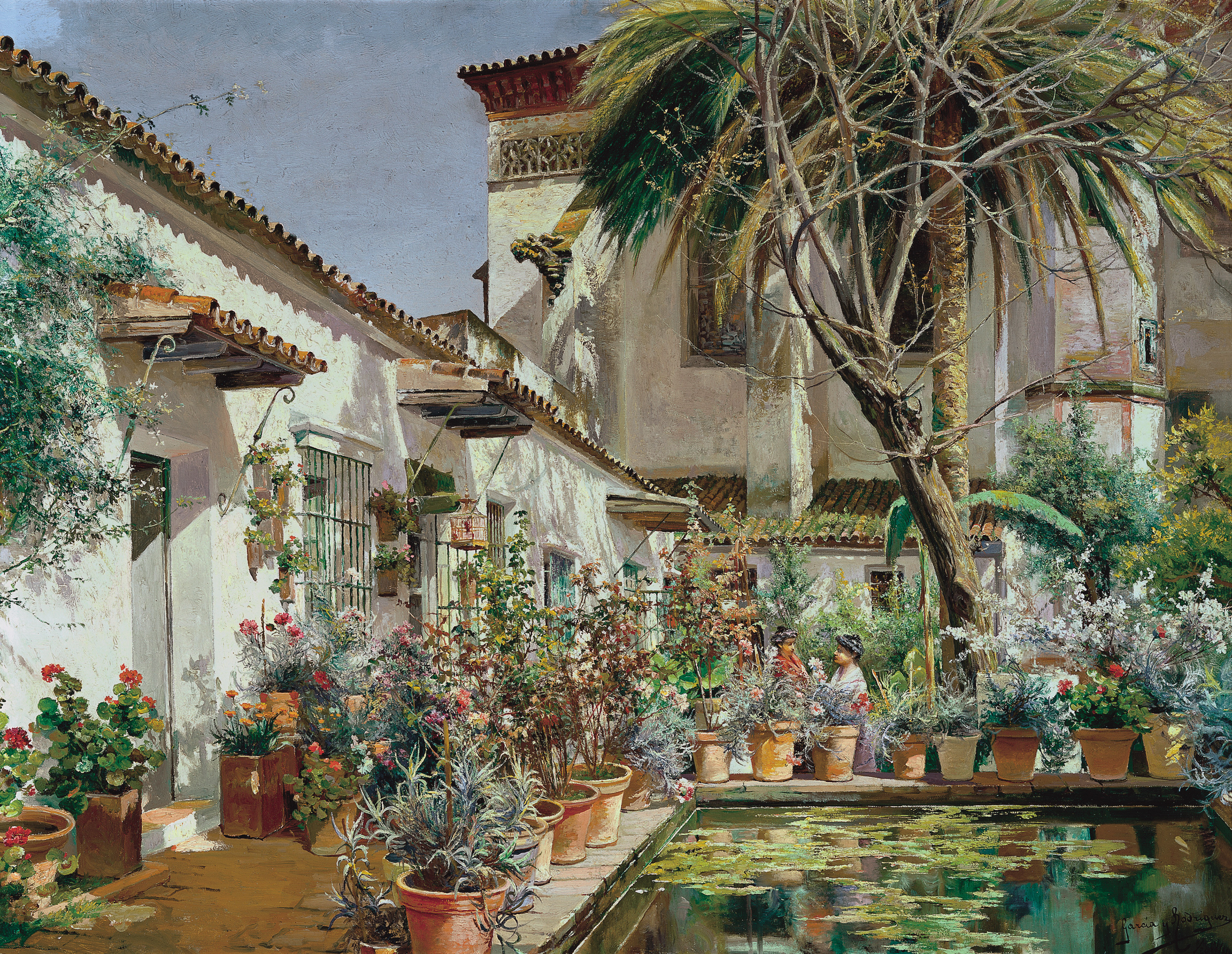
First Atrium of Santa Paula Convent, Seville by Manuel García y Rodríguez, c 1920-25

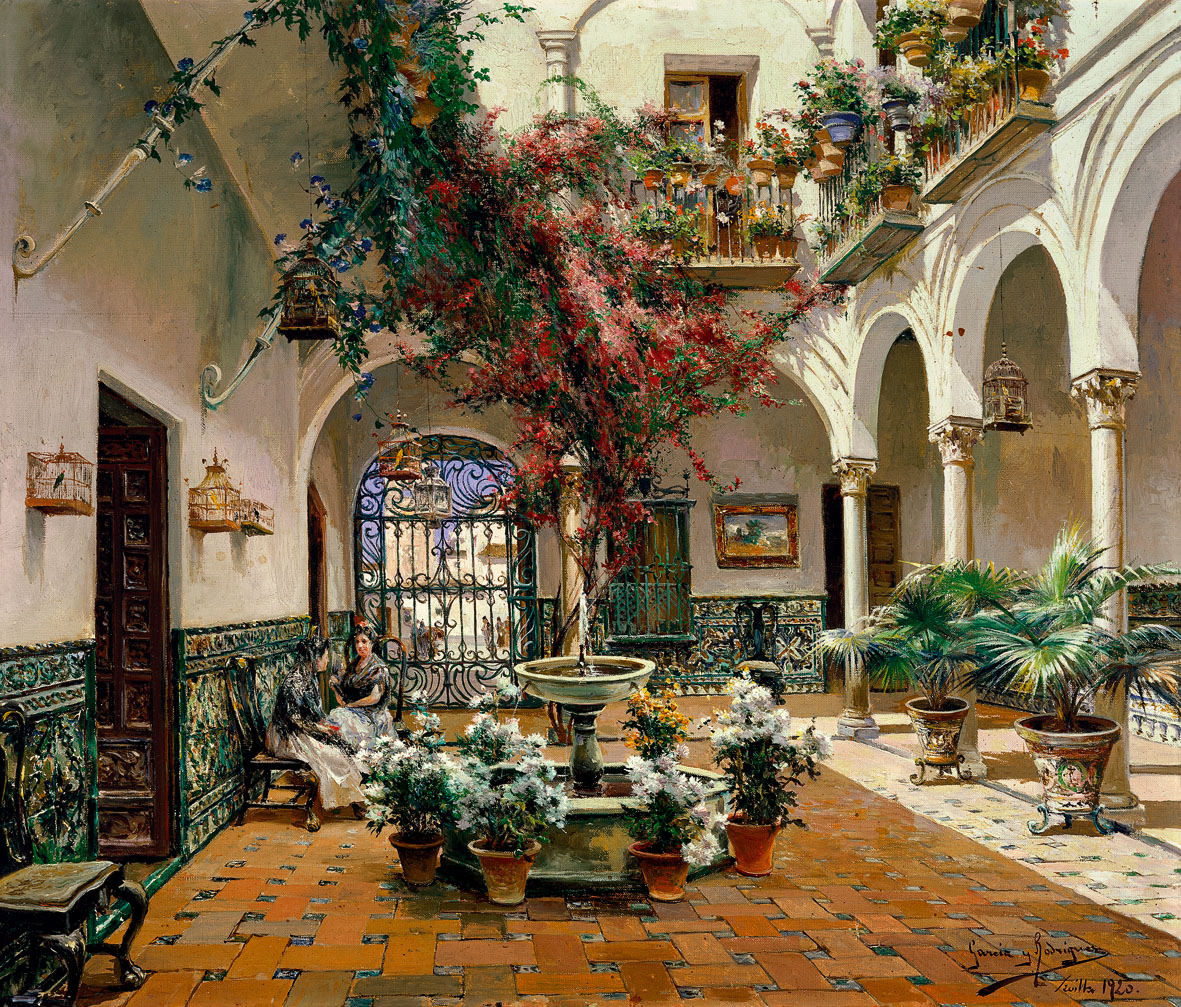
Interior Courtyard, Seville by Manuel García y Rodríguez, c 1920

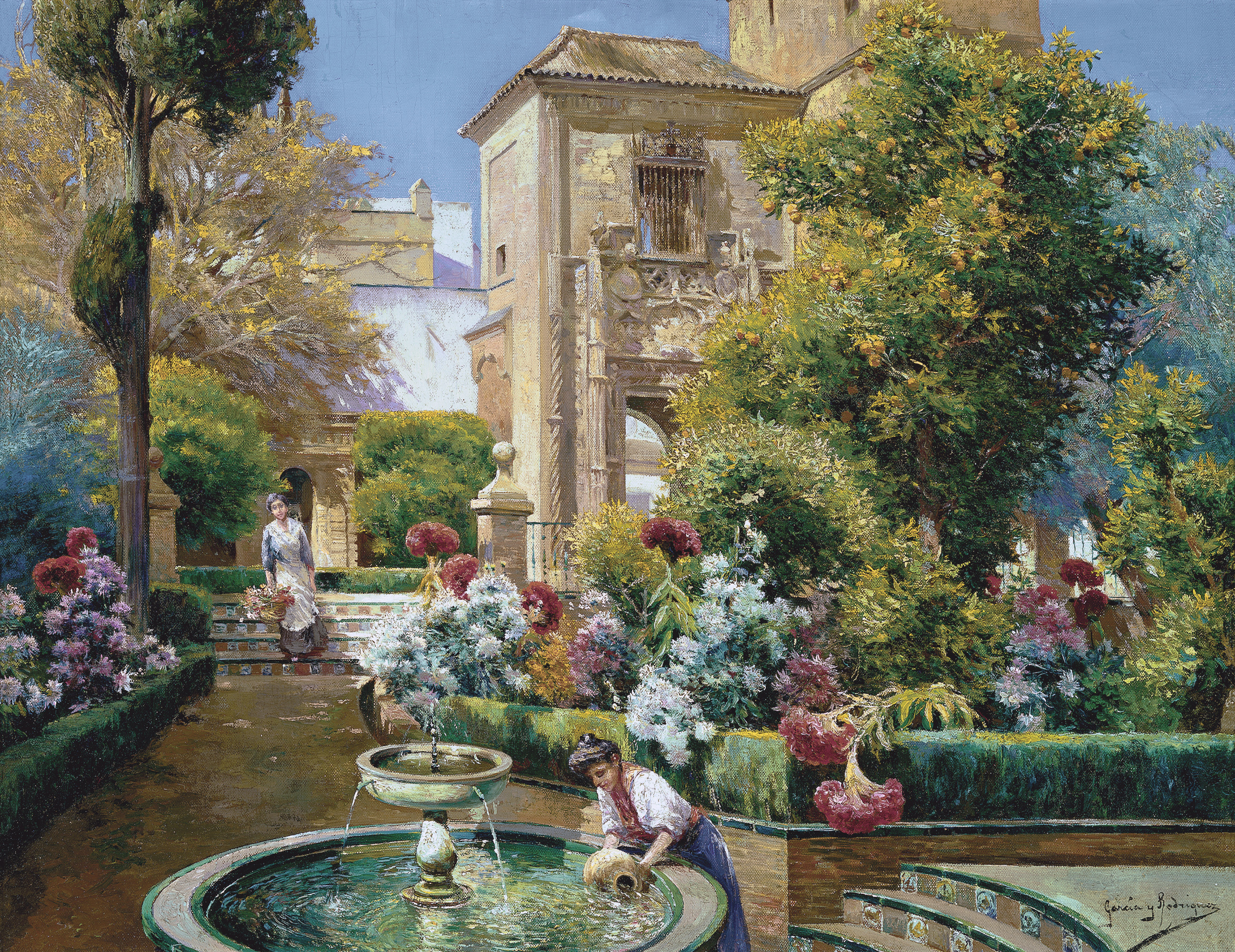
The Garden of Alcázar Seville by Manuel García y Rodríguez, c 1920
