= Rafael Senet Pérez =

Spanish painter (1856–1926)

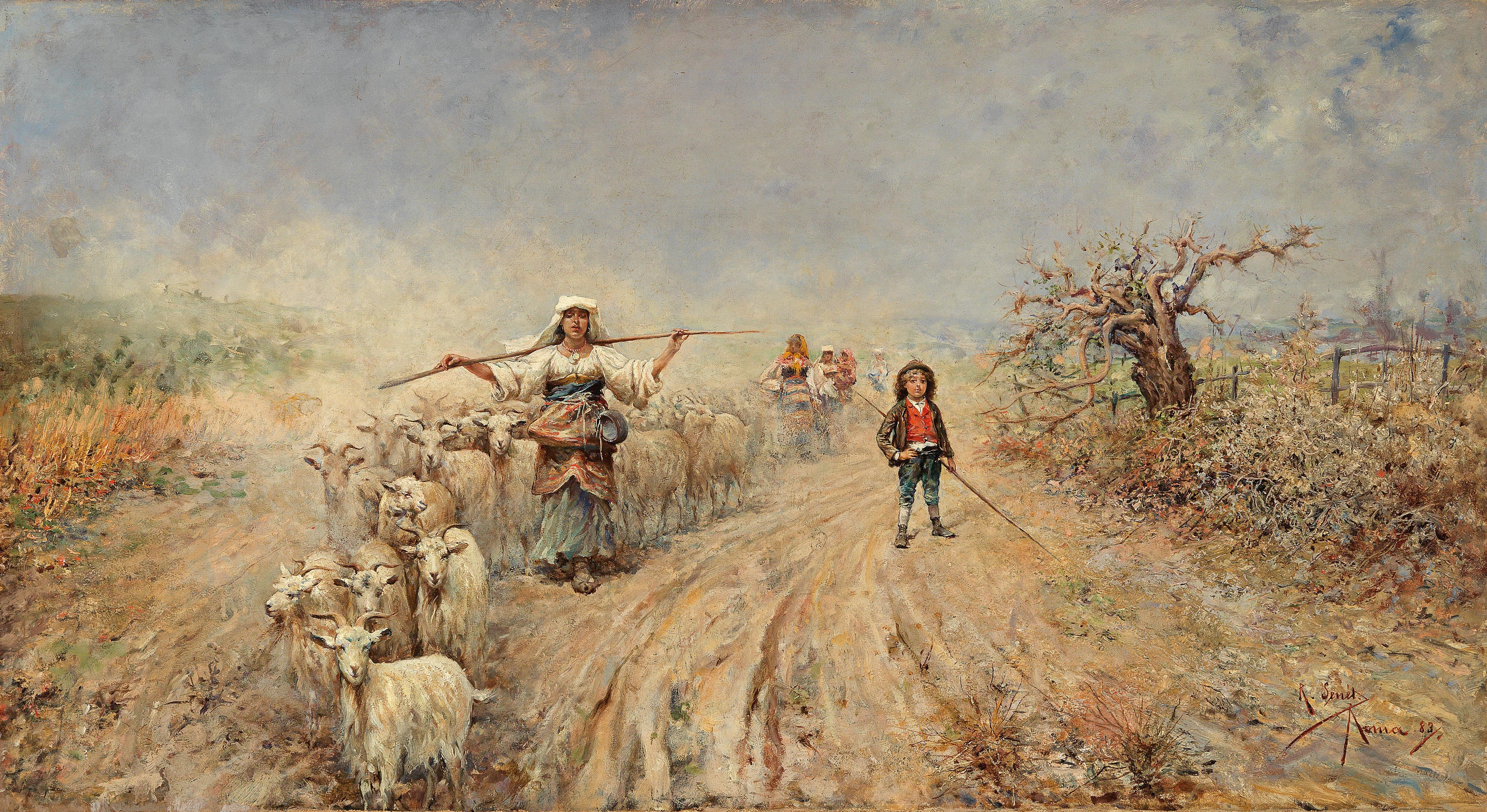
Return of the Herd

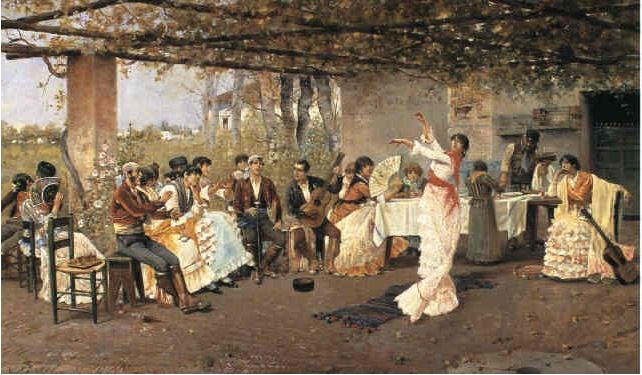
A Party in the Tavern

Rafael Senet Pérez (7 October 1856, Seville - 1926, Seville) was a Spanish painter and watercolorist, known for his costumbrista and Orientalist scenes. He also created numerous vedute of Venice.

== Biography ==
He began studying art at the Real Academia de Bellas Artes de Santa Isabel de Hungría, where his instructors included Joaquín Domínguez Bécquer and Eduardo Cano.

After a brief stop in Madrid in 1880, and with financial assistance from a local banker (Ramón de Ibarra), he took a study trip to Rome, where he came under the influence of José Villegas Cordero. Later, he travelled throughout Italy and spent an extended period creating views of Venice.

For his work El regreso de la pesca en Nápoles (The Return of the Fishing (fishermen) in Naples), he was awarded a second-place medal at the National Exhibition of Fine Arts of 1884. That same year, he received second-prize at an exposition in Munich. He also exhibited at the "Exposición del Centro de Acuarelistas" (watercolorists) in Barcelona and at the fifth "Muestra Internacional de Bellas Artes" of 1907.

He was associated with the landscape painting group, the Alcalá de Guadaira school, led by Emilio Sánchez Perrier.

Many of his works are in private collections; notably in England, where they were exhibited and sold by Arthur Tooth & Sons.

== Sources ==
- Biographical notes @ the Museo del Prado
- Enrique Valdivieso González, La pintura sevillana del siglo XIX, Sevilla, 1981 ISBN 84-300-6127-4
