= Alcalá de Guadaíra =

- Municipality
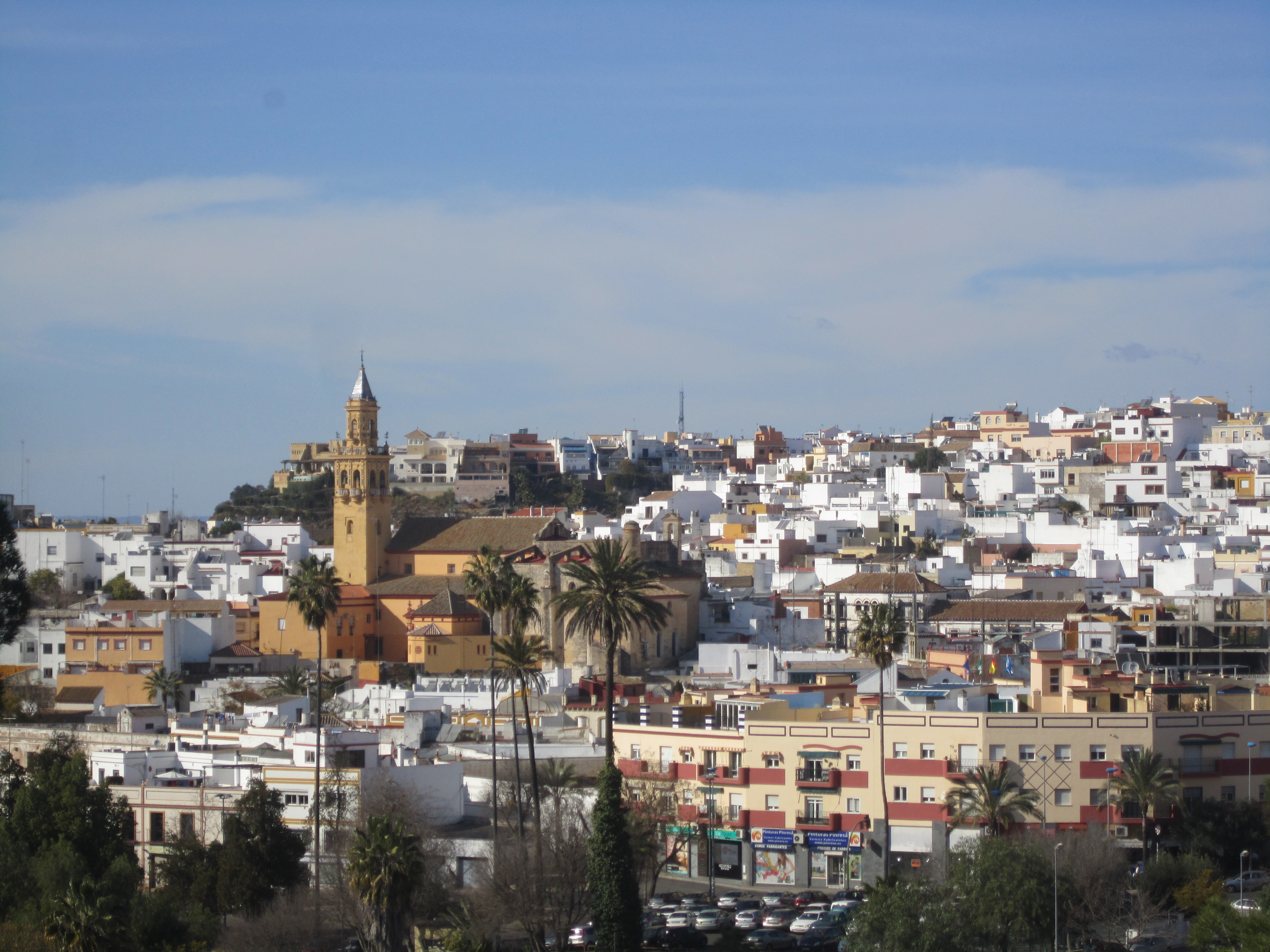

- Flag Coat of arms
- Interactive map of Alcalá de Guadaíra
- Coordinates: 37°20′00″N 5°51′00″W
- Country: Spain
- Region: Andalusia
- Province: Sevilla

Government
  - Mayor: Ana Isabel Jiménez Contreras (PSOE)

Area
  - Total: 284.61 km^{2} (109.89 sq mi)
- Elevation: 46 m (151 ft)

Population (2025-01-01)
  - Total: 77,474
  - Density: 272.21/km^{2} (705.02/sq mi)
- Demonym: Alcalareños
- Time zone: UTC+1 (CET)
  - Summer (DST): UTC+2 (CEST)
- Postal code: 41500
- Website: Official website

Alcalá de Guadaíra (Spanish pronunciation: [alkaˈla ðe ɣwaˈðajɾa]) is a town located approximately 17 km southeast of Seville, Spain; in recent years the expansion of Seville has meant that Alcalá has become a suburb of that city. Alcalá used to be known as Alcalá de los Panaderos (Alcalá of the Bakers) because it provided most of Seville's bread. The town is located on the banks of the Guadaíra River, and watermills built during the Moorish period of Spain can still be found in the area.

== History ==
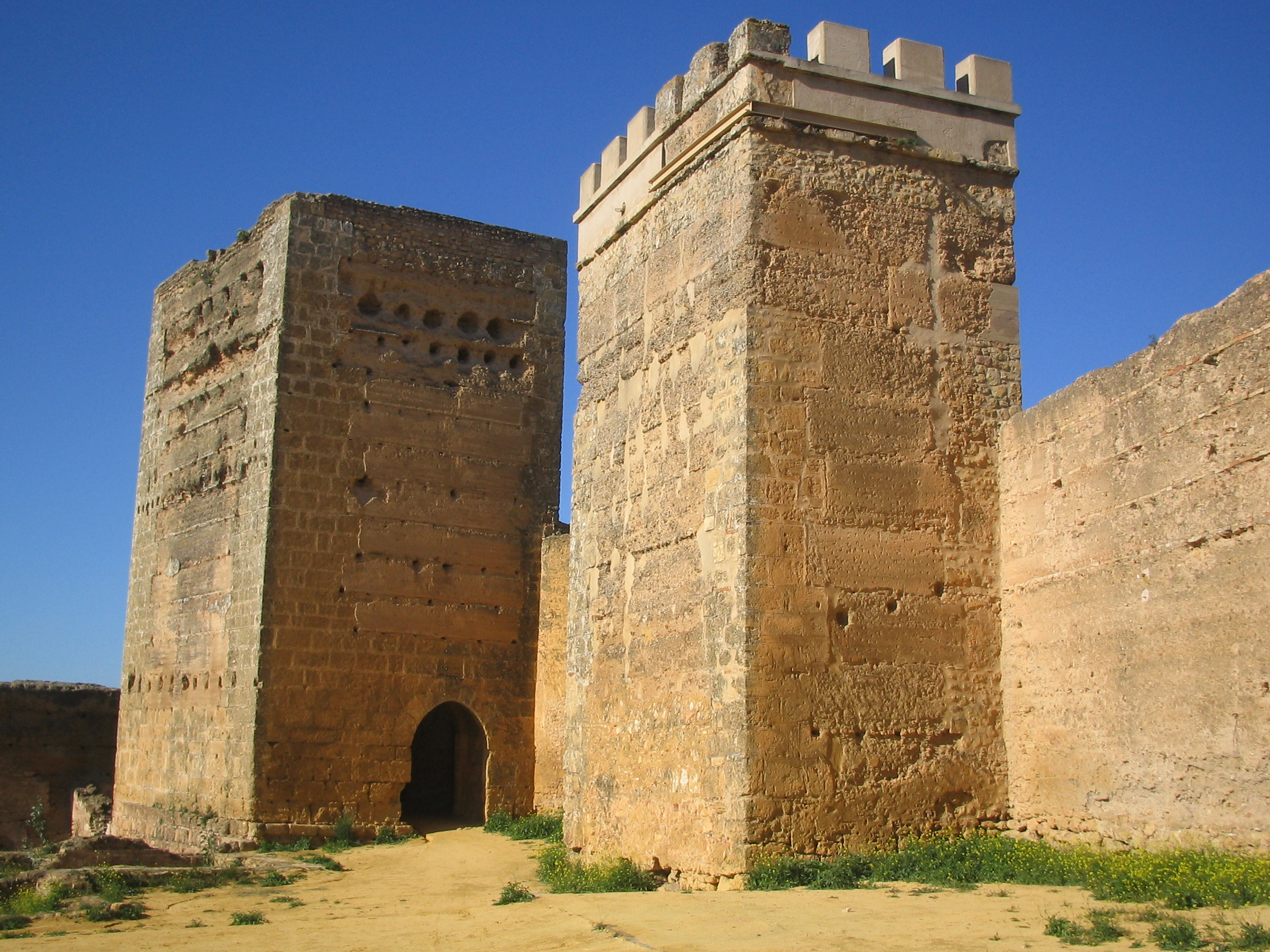
Towers of the city's fortress

Irippo, the main Turdetan city in the Guadaíra basin, was located in Mesa de Gandul (Alcalá de Guadaíra), and minted its own coin in Roman times. The site of Alcalá was taken by Muslim forces in the 8th century and their name has held to modern times. The toponym Alcalá, from the Arabic القلعة al-qalʿa for fortification or citadel, is shared by many places throughout Spain.

Alcalá de Guadaíra was under the domination of multiple Muslim kingdoms from the Umayyad Caliphate in 756 to the fall of the Almohads in 1244. It was the Almohads who built extensive fortifications on a promontory overlooking the river. These fortifications continue to dominate the south-west side of the town. In 1244, Alcalá de Guadaíra was retaken by Ferdinand III of Castile who was responsible for the refurbishing of the castle and town fortifications, which were subsequently used as a royal prison with a military presence. Following Ferdinand's death it fell into disrepair and ceased to be a prison or military barracks.

Alcalá was home to a small but important Jewish community. In December 1390, Archdeacon Ferrant Martinez led a mob that razed the synagogue to the ground. The members of the Jewish community were soon after put to the sword.

This town was the birthplace of Leandro José de Flores (1776–1839), priest and historian.

== Main sights ==
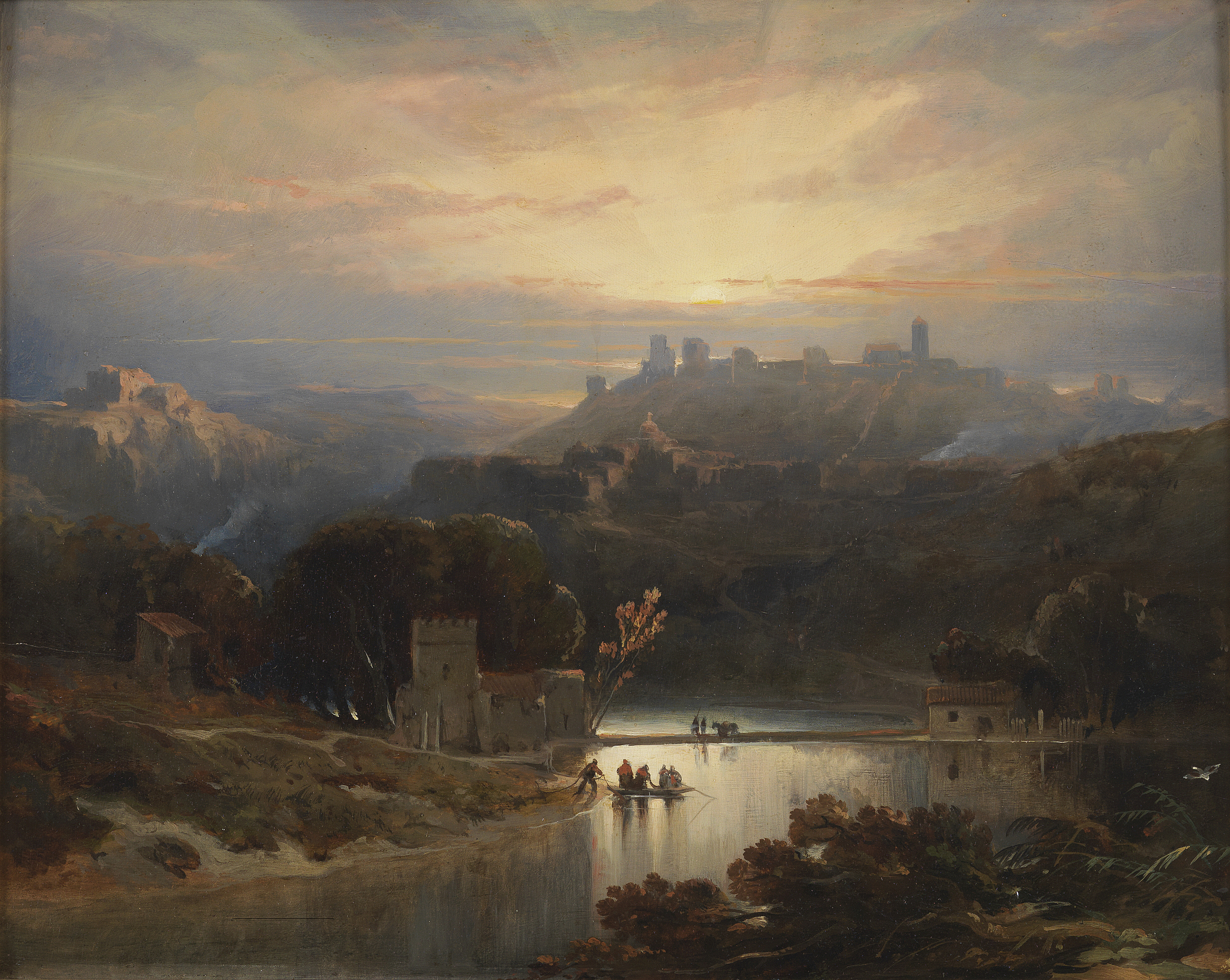
The Castle of Alcalá de Guadaíra by David Roberts, 1833

The current walls date to the 13th and 14th century.

In the castle precincts is The Hermitage of Our Lady of the Eagle (Nuestra Señora del Águila), this building dates from the mid-13th century when it was the principal church of the town. Over subsequent centuries, as the town expanded, more churches were constructed and the church of Santiago became the principal parish. Many of the valuable artifacts were taken from the hermitage to Santiago but the image of "La Virgin del Águila" remains there. The image of the virgin is a replica of the original that was destroyed in 1936.

The nearby Marchenilla Castle (14th century) was built on the ruins of a Roman estate.

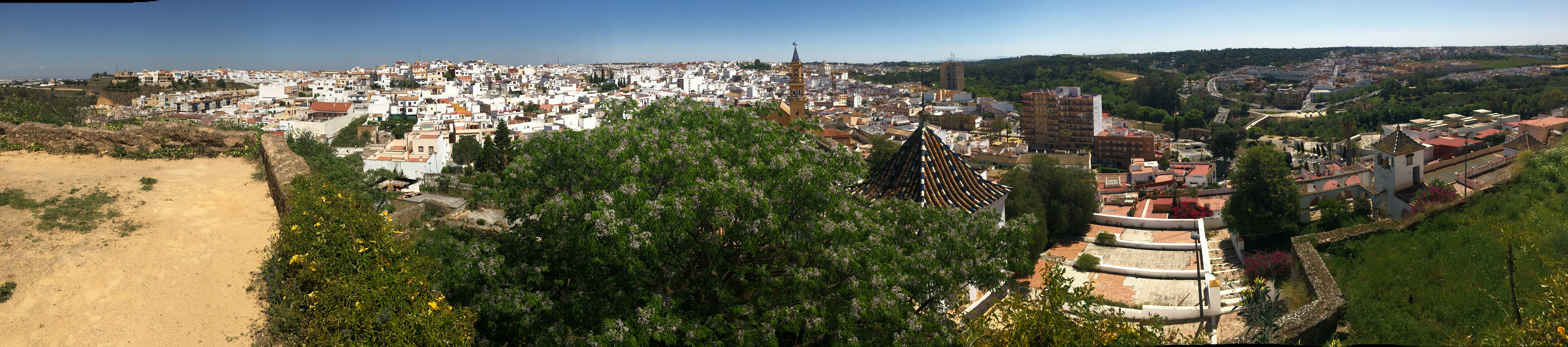

== Economy ==
Without doubt Alcalá de Guadaíra is an industrial town. Its industrial heritage started in the watermills constructed by the Moors on the banks of the River Guadaíra. These mills were used to grind grain to make flour which supplied bakers in the area. This led over the centuries to Alcalá's reputation as the "bread basket" of Seville. The other industry of historical times was the processing of olives. There were up to 12 olive processing factories in Alcalá in the early 20th century employing many thousands of workers, predominantly women, to prepare the olives for sale after they had been cured. Both of these industries have fallen into decline but have been replaced by a wide range of modern light and heavy industries on the numerous industrial estates in the north and west of the municipality. The town provides employment not only for local inhabitants but for residents of local towns.

== Geography ==
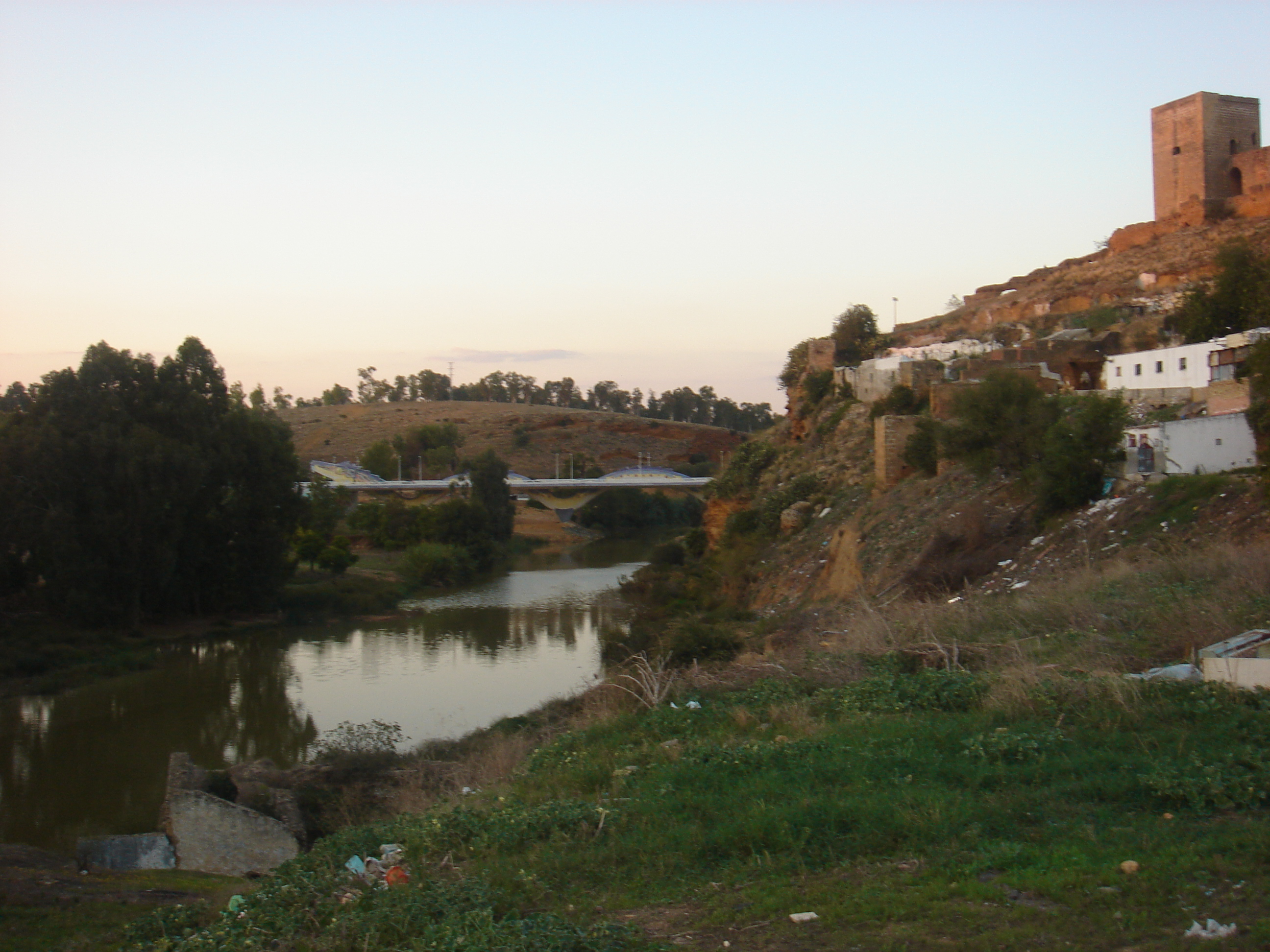
Guadaíra River.

Situated in southern Spain, Alcalá enjoys a Mediterranean climate characterised by mild wet winters and hot dry summers. The town is on elevated terrain in relation to Seville. This area is known as Los Alcores, and Alcalá is the largest urban development in this area.

The River Guadaíra runs through town and has in places formed a steep-sided valley with low cliffs. The upper river watershed runs from the east and south-east of town. It proceeds through town and joins the Guadalquivir to the south of Seville. The river has for many years been heavily contaminated with the by-products of olive processing and other waste being dumped directly into the river. Large amounts of foam and an unpleasant smell are not uncommon features of the river in winter. Despite this, the river provides a haven for much wildlife as its banks are well covered with trees and vegetation. Until the beginning of the 20th century, in 1930 the dam was built in the Guadalquivir river as it passes Alcalá del Río, the Guadaira River was a major spawning river basin for the European Sturgeon (Acipenser sturio) sustaining a successful fishery and caviar industry in the area. On 28 March 2007 the only figurative bridge in Europe, the Dragon Bridge, was inaugurated as part of the town's beltway.

On the southern side of the river is a large area of stone pine woodland, Oromana.

== Transportation ==
The A-92 motorway runs east–west through the north part of the town and the A-392 road runs from NE to SW through the town. The Tranvía Metropolitano de Alcalá de Guadaíra has been under construction since 2007, but has not opened as of 2020.

== See also ==
- List of municipalities in Seville
