= Alcalá de Guadaira school =

The Alcalá de Guadaira school refers to the circle of painters, initially brought together by Manuel Ussel de Guimbarda, but which revolved around Emilio Sanchez Perrier after approximately 1890. The group assembled and painted en plein air on the banks of the Guadaíra, near Seville.

== See also ==
- Art history
