= Emilio Sánchez Perrier =

Spanish artist (1855–1907)

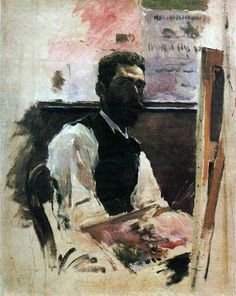
- Emelio Sánchez Perrier, Self-portrait
- Born: 15 October 1855; Seville
- Died: 13 September 1907 (aged 51); Alhama de Granada
- Education: School of Fine Arts in Granada; School of Fine Arts in Seville; Real Academia de Bellas Artes de San Fernando in Madrid; Studios of Auguste Bolard, Jean-Léon Gérôme and Félix Ziem in Paris.
- Known for: Painter
- Movement: Orientalist
- Awards: Commander of the Order of Isabella the Catholic

Emilio Sánchez Perrier (1855–1907) was a Spanish landscape painter and watercolorist who also painted Orientalist subjects.

== Life and career ==
Perrier was born in Seville on 15 October 1855. His father, Manuel Sanchez, ran a watchmaking shop in the Calle Sierpes. His father taught him watchmaking, but Perrier was interested in art and became a painter of landscapes and orientalist scenes, often in watercolor.

He began to study under Eduardo Cano de la Peja and Joaquin Dominguez Bécquer about 1868, at the age of 13, in Seville at Alcalá de Guadaira. He was among a circle of artists led by Manuel Ussel de Guimbarda at Seville.

In 1871, he resided in Granada, where he befriended Mariano Fortuny. He studied under Joaquín Domínguez Bécquer and Eduardo Cano at the School of Fine Arts in Granada. He studied under Carlos de Haes at the Real Academia de Bellas Artes de San Fernando in Madrid.

He traveled to Paris in 1879 and studied at the studios of Auguste Boulard at the Barbizon School and in the studios of Jean-Léon Gérôme and Félix Ziem.

In Granada, he worked with Martín Rico.

Perrier was a member of the Academy of Fine Arts of Seville and General Society of Fine Arts of France. He was a commander of the Order of Isabella the Catholic.

Perrier died in Alhama de Granada on September 13, 1907.

== Selected paintings ==
Selected paintings of Museo Del Prado,

- Flooding of the Alameda de Hércules in Seville, composite pencil on woven paper, 102 x 163 mm, 1876 [D009580]
- Wooded landscape with a column or pillory, gray ink, wash, pen, black ink on woven paper, 88 x 125 mm, 1878 [D009585]
- Rocky Landscape with Ruins on a Cloudy Day, gray ink, wash, pen, black ink on woven paper, 89 x 126 mm, 1878 [D009586]
- Country house with a cart and chickens, gray ink, pen, black ink, composite pencil on woven paper, 89 x 126 mm, 1878 [D009587]
- Notes on Mudejar mullion windows and Romanesque doorway of the Monasterio de Piedra in Nuévalos (?), Zaragoza, compound pencil, wash, brush, black ink, brown ink on woven paper, 89 x 126 mm, 1878 [D009588]
- Sketch of the bell tower of the Monasterio de Piedra in Nuévalos, Zaragoza, gray ink, wash, brush, black ink on woven paper, 89 x 126 mm, 1878 [D009589]
- Notes on figures: traditional types, gouache, brush, pen, black ink on woven paper, 89 x 126 mm, 1878 [D009591]
- Study of a majo with a saddlebag, watercolour, pencil composed on woven paper, 260 x 173 mm, 1875 - 1880 [D009582]
- Study of the head of Don Quixot, brush, pen, black ink on wove paper, 100 x 6.7 mm, 1875 - 1880 [D009579]
- View of the surroundings of the Cartuja de Jerez de la Frontera, Cádiz, charcoal, composite pencil on woven paper, 262 x 387 mm, around 1880 [D009577]
- The doctor Pedro Ruiz Prieto, watercolor, opaque pigment wash [gouache, tempera] on woven paper, 141 x 88 mm, around 1880 [D009578]
- Self-portrait, watercolor on woven paper, 158 x 110 mm, around 1880 [D009581]
- Table with an oil lamp, a pen, papers and cups, gouache, pen, black ink on laid paper, 178 x 113 mm, around 1880 [D009583]
- Notes on figures: popular types, gouache, pen, brown ink on wove paper, 79 x 135 mm, around 1880 [D009590]
- Notes on figures: men with capes and seated women, gouache, brush, pen, brown ink on wove paper, 79 x 138 mm, around 1880 [D009592]
- View of the Castle of Alcalá de Guadaíra, charcoal on wove paper, 603 x 405 mm, 1881 [D004942]
- View of Venice, oil on panel, 35.5 x 22.5 cm, 1885 [P007587]
- Gisors landscape, oil on panel, 15 x 27.5 cm, around 1895 [P004641]
- February, oil on canvas, 100 x 207 cm, 1890 [P006363]
- A musketeer, gouache, pen, black ink on laid paper, 178 x 113 mm, last quarter of the 19th century [D009584]

== Gallery ==
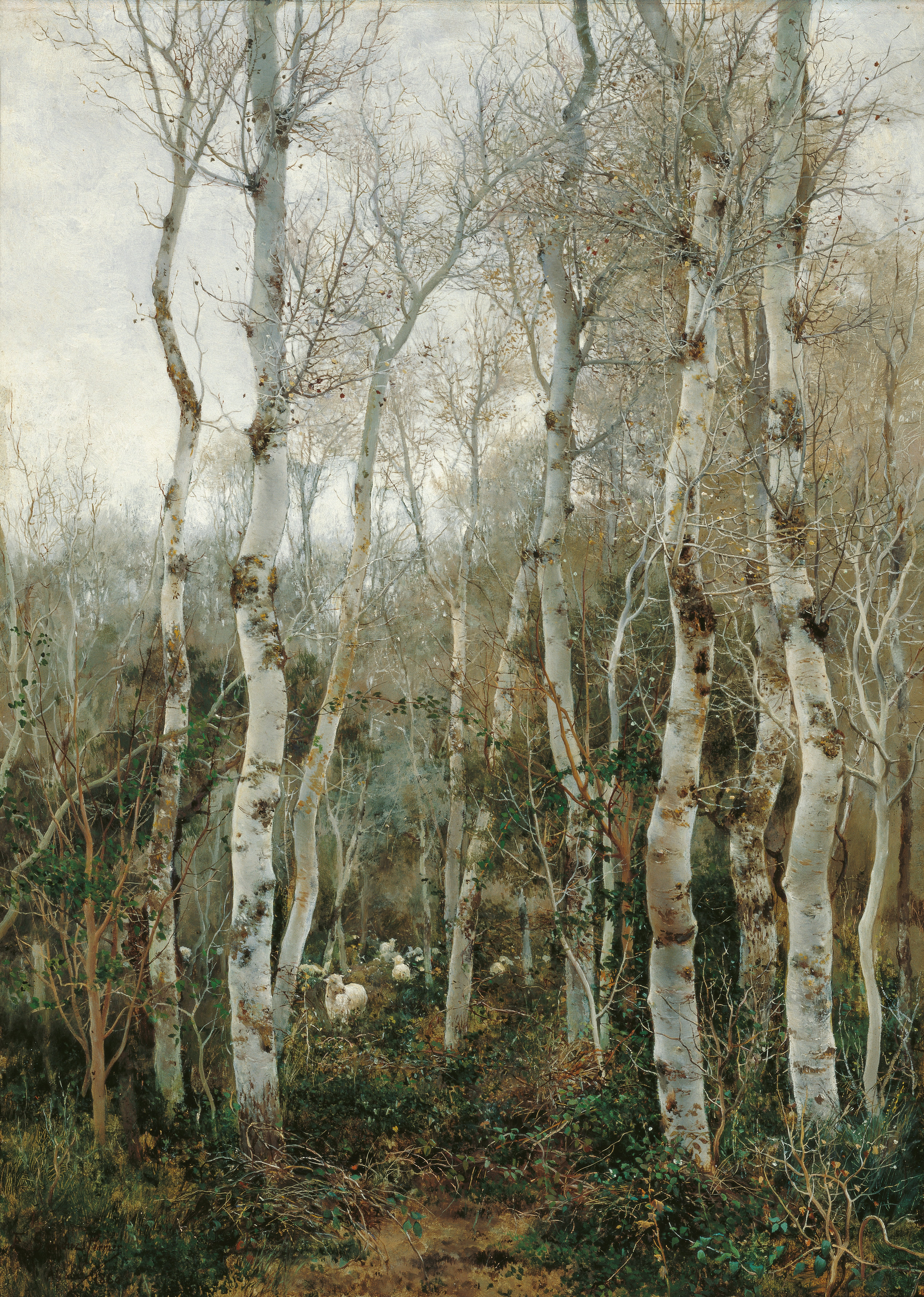
Winter in Andalusia, 1880

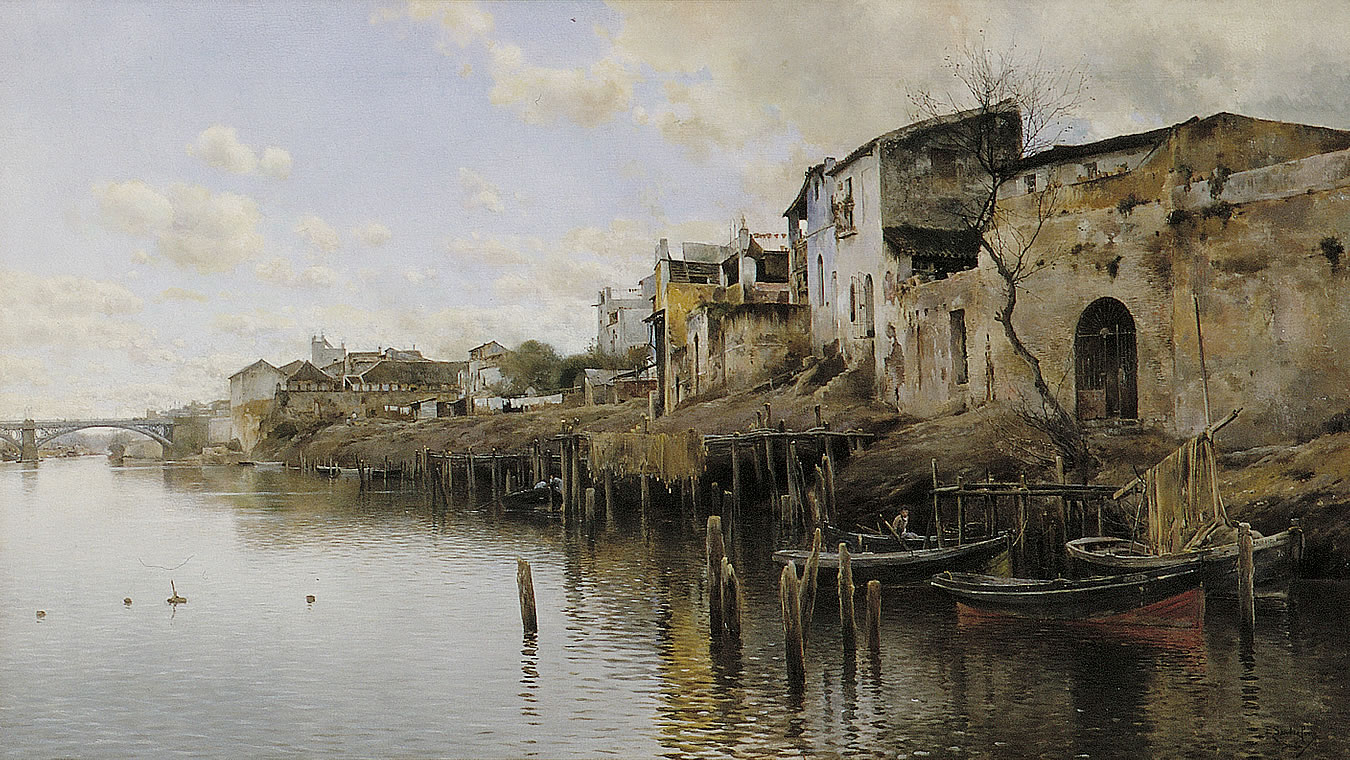
Triana, 1889

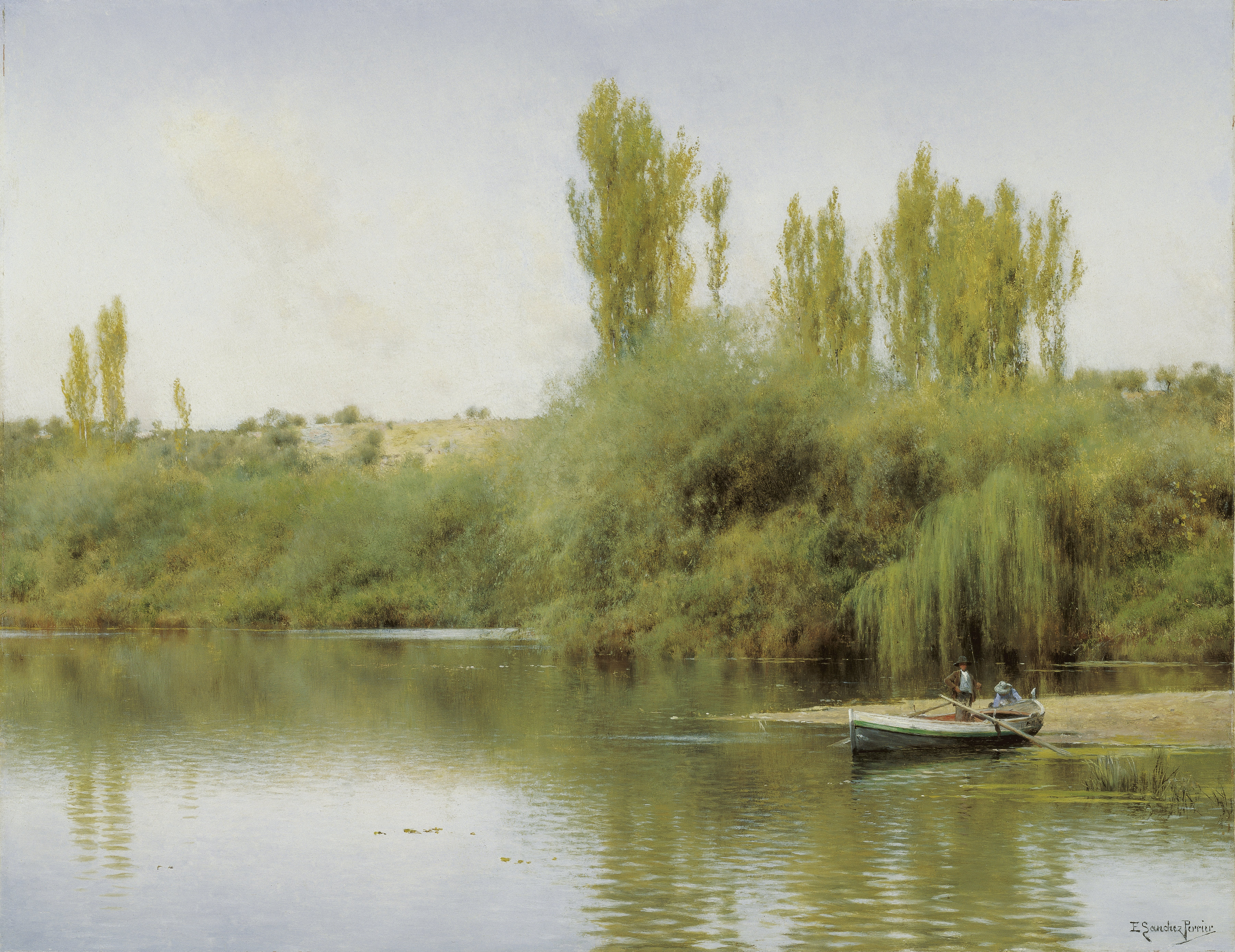
Bank of the Guadaira with Boat, c. 1890

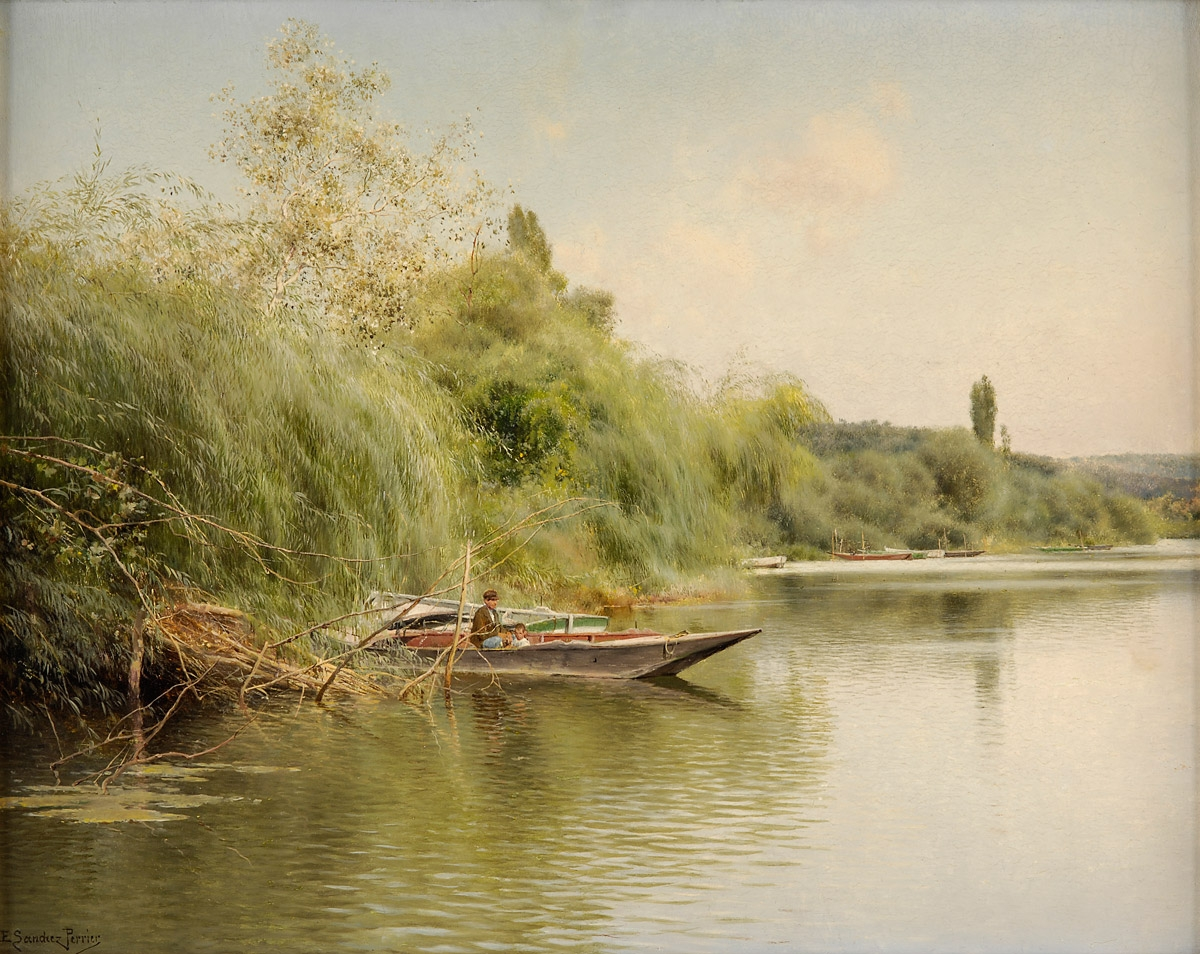
Fisher and son in boat, 1907

== See also ==
- List of Orientalist artists
- Orientalism
