= Félix Ziem =

French painter (1821–1911)

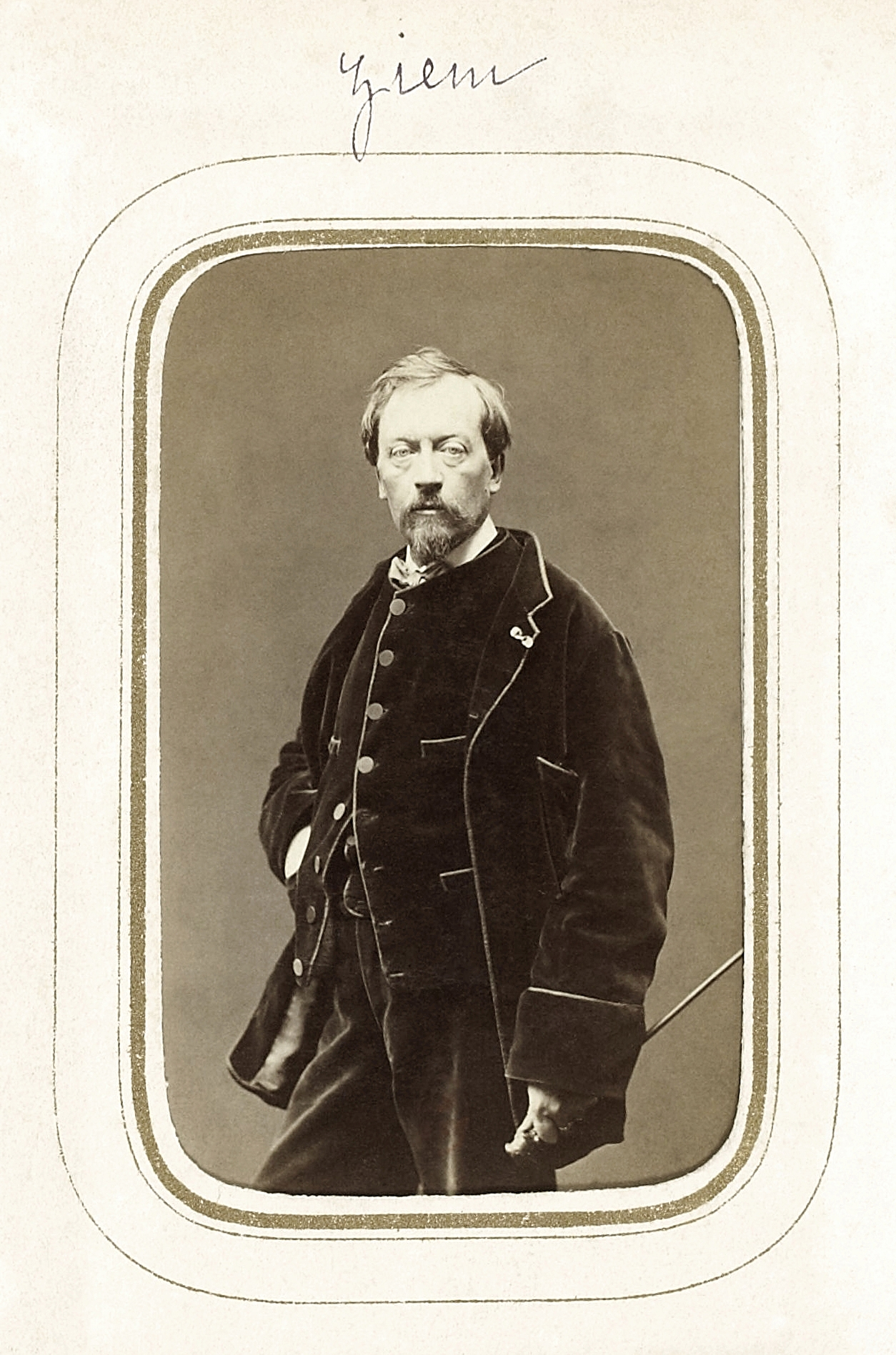
- Félix Ziem in c. 1865
- Born: 26 February 1821; Beaune, Côte-d'Or, France
- Died: 10 November 1911 (aged 90); Paris, France
- Resting place: Père Lachaise Cemetery, Paris
- Education: École des Beaux-Arts, Dijon; Adolphe Monticelli, Marseille
- Known for: Painter
- Movement: Barbizon; Orientalist
- Awards: Chevalier of the Legion of Honor

Félix Ziem (26 February 1821 – 10 November 1911) was a French painter in the style of the Barbizon School, who also produced some Orientalist works.

== Biography ==
He was born Félix-Francois Georges Philibert Ziem in Beaune in the Côte-d'Or département of the Burgundy région of France. His mother was a native of Burgundy who had married an immigrant from Croatia. Originally, Ziem planned to be an architect, studied in the École des Beaux-Arts in Dijon, and for a time he worked as an architect. In 1839 he moved to Marseille, where he received some informal instruction in painting from Adolphe Monticelli.

Painting developed from a hobby into a career following a visit in 1841 to Italy, where he fell in love with the city of Venice, a place that would become the source for many of his works, and to which he returned annually until 1892. Apart from Venetian scenes, he also painted many still lifes, portraits, and landscapes of diverse locations which reflected his travels. Following a year-long trip to the Ottoman Empire and Egypt in 1857-58, he began to include works with an Orientalist theme in his oeuvre. His landscapes included scenes from a variety of locations including Constantinople, Egypt, Martigues, Cagnes-sur-Mer and his native Burgundy. Ziem was a commercially successful artist in his own lifetime.

== Career ==
Ziem's works were first exhibited in 1849 at the Paris Salon, and Ziem remained a regular exhibitor there for many years. He also traveled extensively throughout Europe and in 1860 moved to Montmartre, the artistic quarter of the city of Paris. Financially successful, he was known to assist struggling young artists.

In 1857, the government of France recognized his contribution to the art world by making him a Chevalier of the Legion of Honor, and an officer of the Legion in 1878.

Félix Ziem died in 1911 and was interred in the Père Lachaise Cemetery in Paris.

== Selected paintings ==
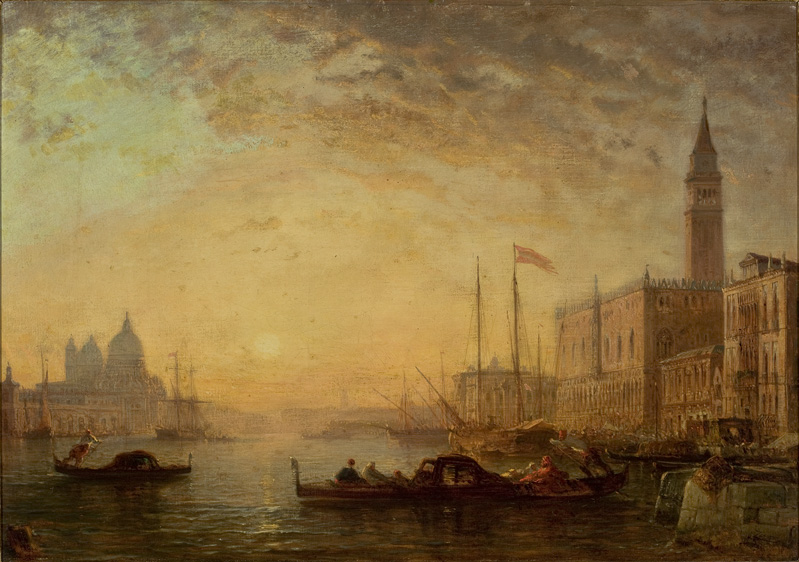
The Grand Canal in Venice (1890-1900) (São Paulo Museum of Art).

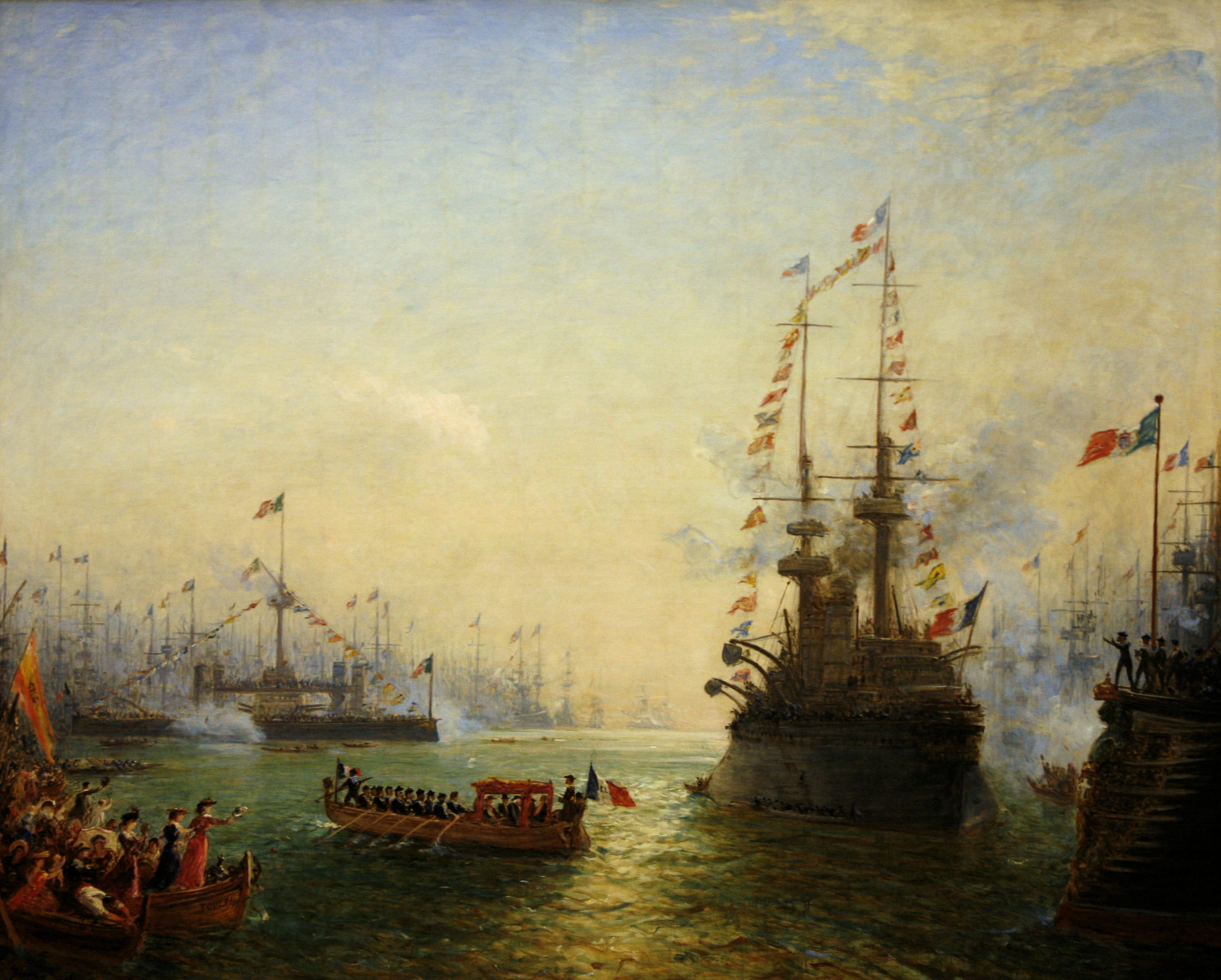
French President Émile Loubet Visiting the French and Italian Squadrons in Toulon (1901)

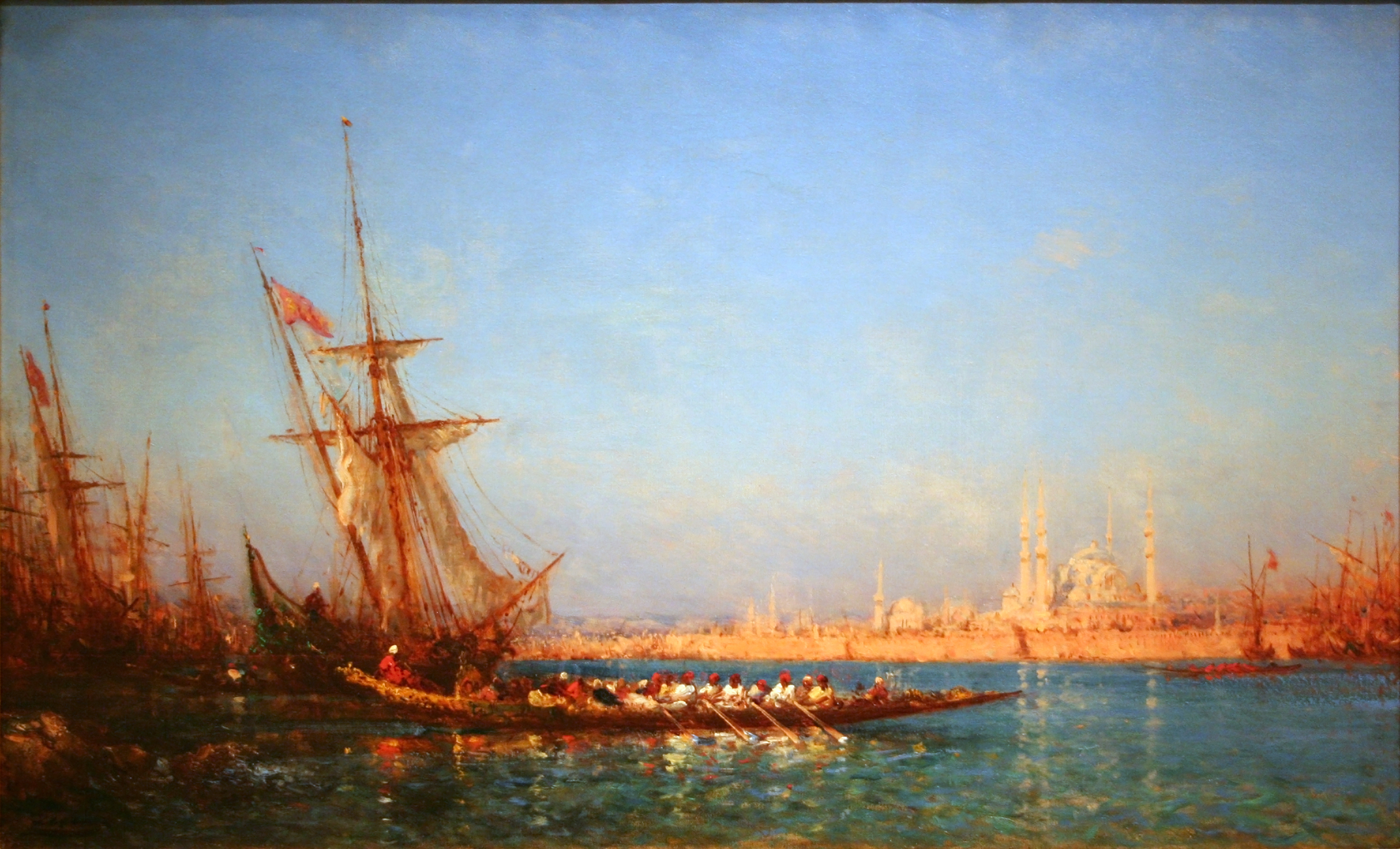
View of Istanbul
(Pera Museum, Istanbul)

== See also ==
- List of Orientalist artists
