= Leandro José de Flores =

Spanish priest and historian

Leandro José de Flores (1776 – 14 April 1839), also known as Father Flores, was a Spanish priest and historian.

== Selected works ==
- Memorias historicas de la villa de Alcalá de Guadaira: Desde sus primeros pobladores hasta la conquista y repartimiento por San Fernando (in Spanish). Mariano Caro. 1833.
- Noticias varias de la collación de San Roque extra muros de esta ciudad de Sevilla. Imprenta Real. 1817.
