= Manuel Ussel de Guimbarda =

Spanish painter

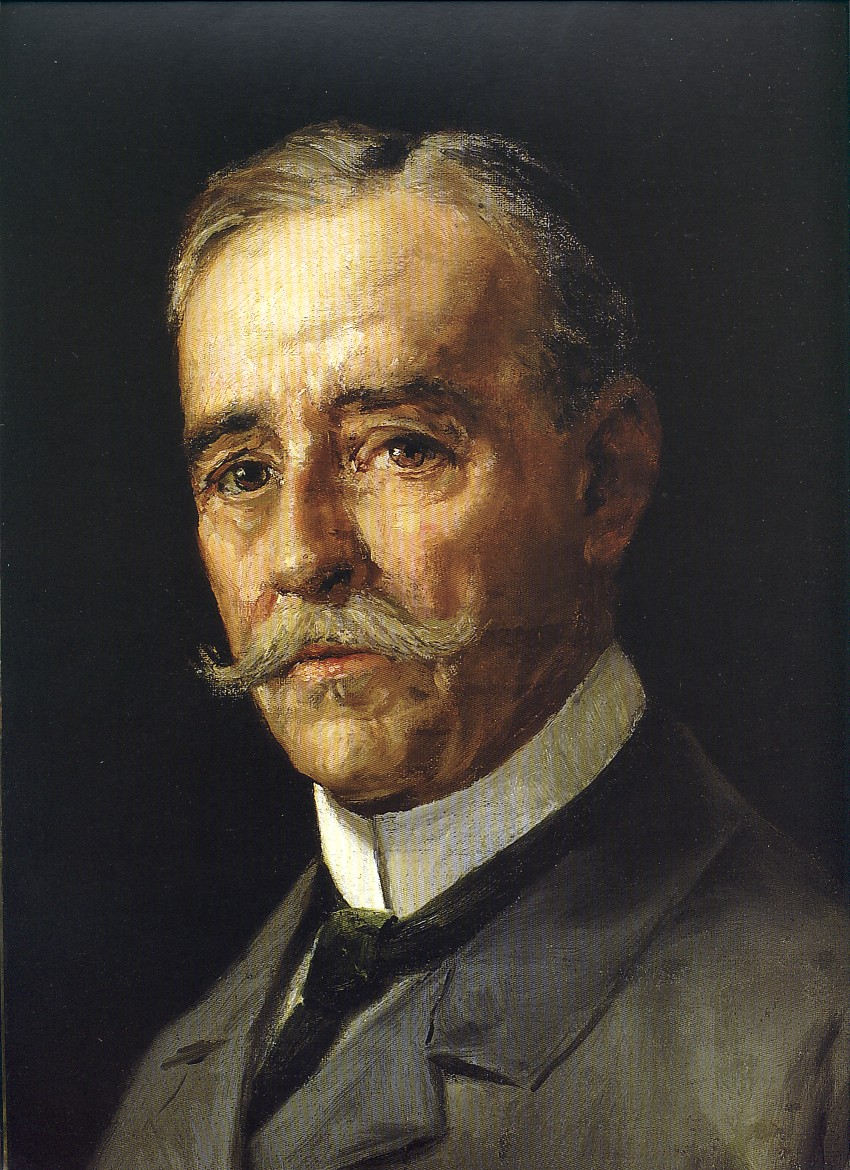
- Self-portrait, c.1875
- Born: 26 November 1833; Havana
- Died: 9 May 1907 (aged 73); Cartagena, Spain
- Education: Royal Academy of San Fernando, Madrid

Manuel Ussel de Guimbarda y Malibrán (26 November 1833 – 9 May 1907) was a Spanish painter. Ussel is generally seen as "Wssel"; the way he spelled it when signing his works.

== Biography ==
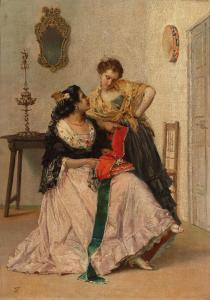
The Red Sash (1872)

He was born in Cuba, where his father, a career military officer, was stationed. After the deaths of his mother and brother in 1841, his father took him back to Spain and began a new posting in San Fernando. In 1843, he travelled to Madrid with his father and a servant and was enrolled at the Royal Academy of San Fernando, where he studied with Leonardo Alenza.

Despite this, Ussel decided to follow in his family's footsteps and became a Lieutenant in 1854. A year later, he painted his first canvas, inspired by the Battle of Lepanto. He then moved to Cartagena, where he continued his studies and became a deputy in the provincial "Commission on Artistic Monuments". He also married the daughter of a wealthy businessman.

Following his father's death, he moved to Seville, where he lived from 1867 until 1886. It was there that he finally devoted himself entirely to art, gaining a reputation as an excellent portrait painter, but also creating numerous historical and religious works as well as costumbrista scenes.

During the Cantonal Revolution, he became deeply involved in local politics. He was also the primary organizer of a society that came to be known as the Escuela de Alcalá de Guadaíra, so called because they gathered on the banks of the Guadaíra River to paint plein aire.

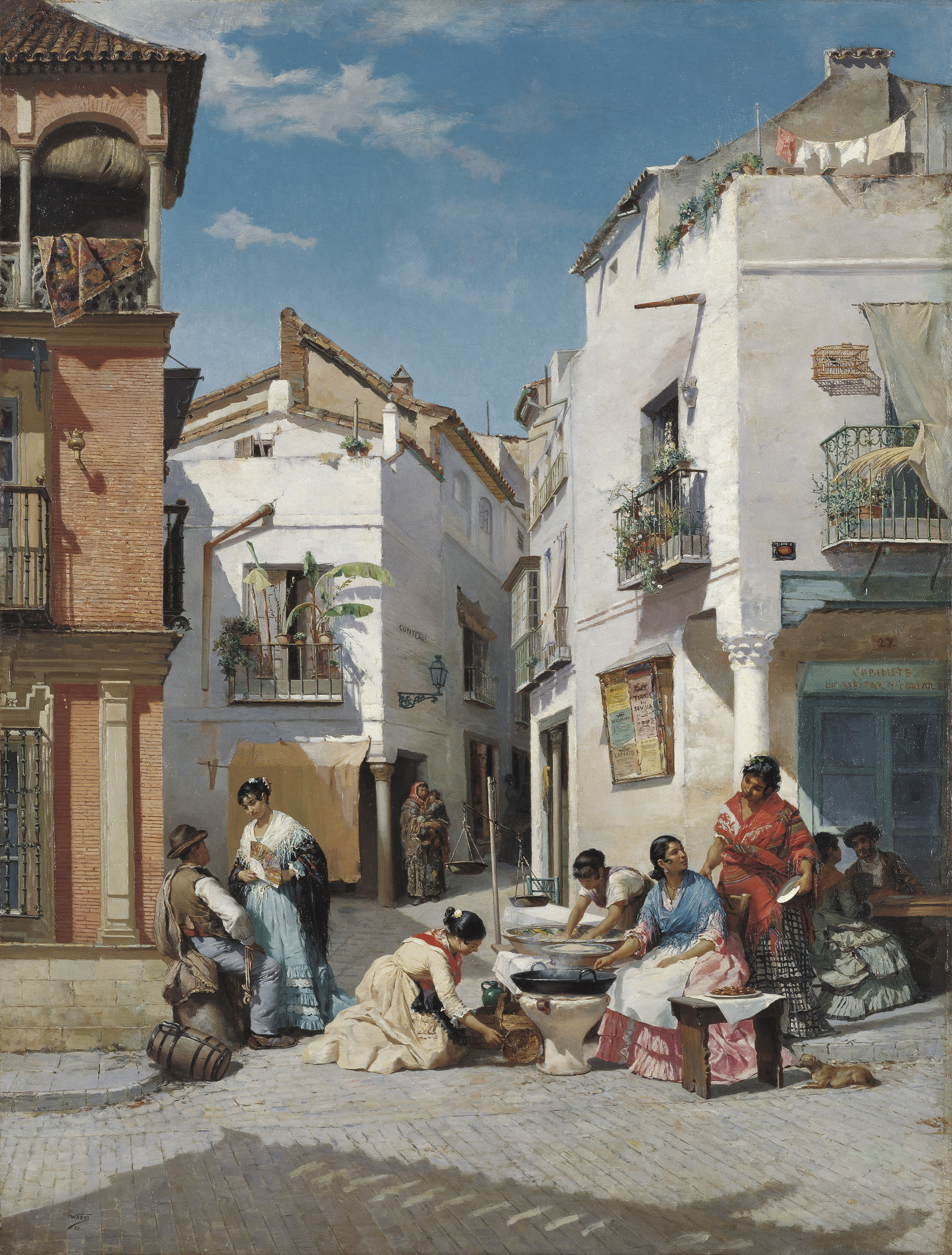
Rosquillo Vendors in Seville (1881)

Ussel returned to Cartagena to take advantage of an economic boom in the area; setting up a workshop and art school for women. In addition to his canvases, he received commissions to create murals and altarpieces, notably at the Iglesia de Santa María de Gracia, and the "Basílica de la Caridad", where he painted the vault of the chapel and images of the Cuatro Santos de Cartagena on the walls.

In Lorca, he painted murals and decorations representing industry, commerce and agriculture at the "Palacio Huerto Ruano" (originally a wealthy businessman's villa; now a museum). Lorca is also the site of his "Crucifixion", in the central part of the apse in the "Colegiata de San Patricio". He died in Cartagena, aged 73.
