= Rousquille =

Type of Catalonian biscuit

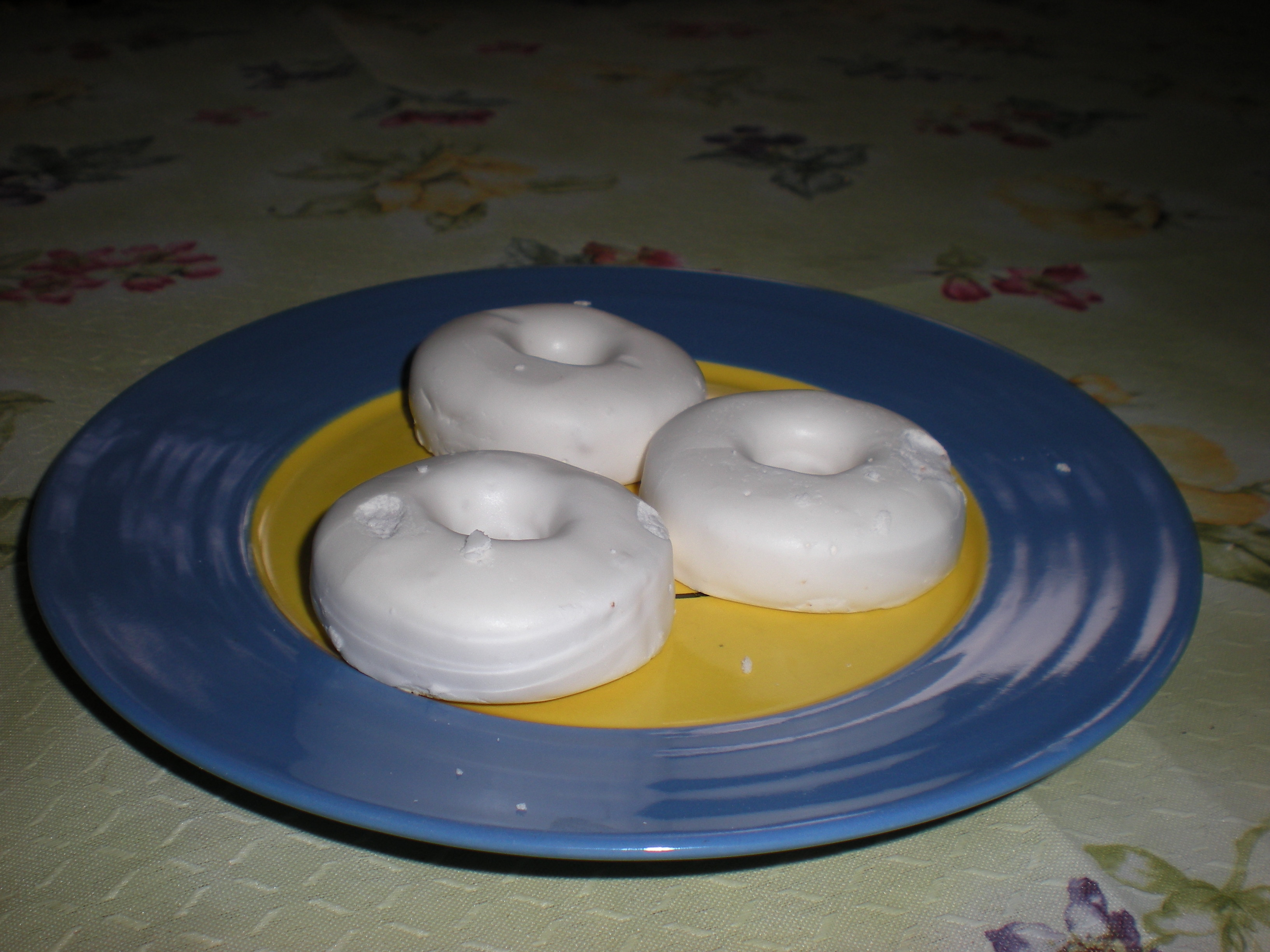
Rousquille

The rousquille or rosquille (rosquilla in Catalan) is a type of sweet-tasting biscuit particular to Catalonia, including the French region of Languedoc-Roussillon. It is a ring-shaped, soft and crumbly pastry often covered with a layer of sugar icing.

== History ==
It originated in the south of Spain, its name coming from a Catalan/Castilian word meaning "little wheel" (rosquilla).
