= Guadaíra =

River in Spain

Coordinates: 37.173791°N 6.102390°W

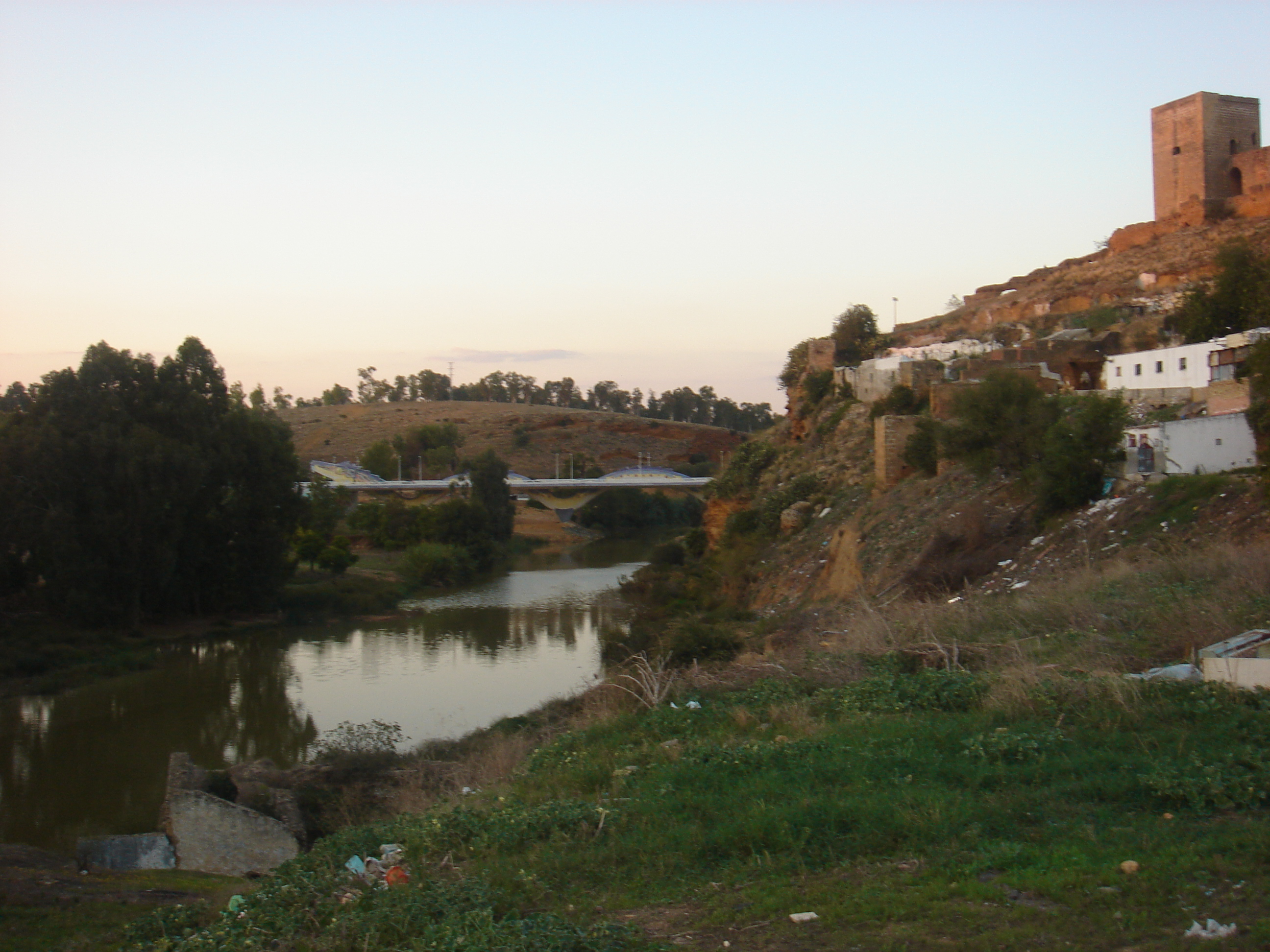
- The river Guadaíra at Alcalá de Guadaíra.

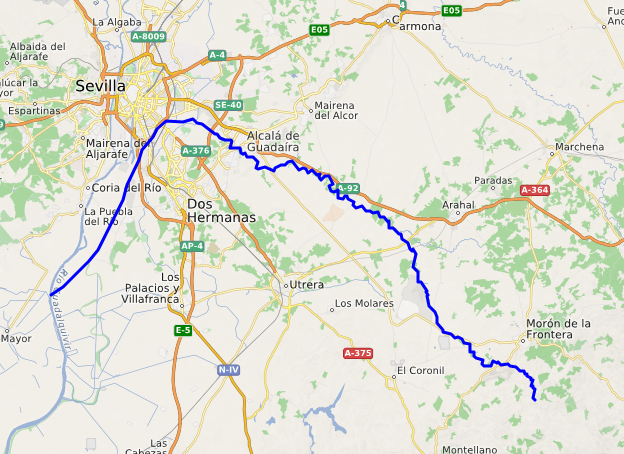
- Course of the Guadaíra
- Native name: Río Guadaíra (Spanish)

Location
- Country: Spain

Physical characteristics
- Mouth: Guadalquivir River
  - location: Spain
- Length: 110 km (68 mi)

Basin features
- Progression: Guadalquivir→ Gulf of Cádiz

The Guadaíra is a river that runs through the province of Seville, in Andalusia, southern Spain. Its name contains the same guad root as the much larger Río Guadalquivir, coming from the Arabic word wadi (Arabic: وَادِي, romanized: wādī), meaning "river valley".

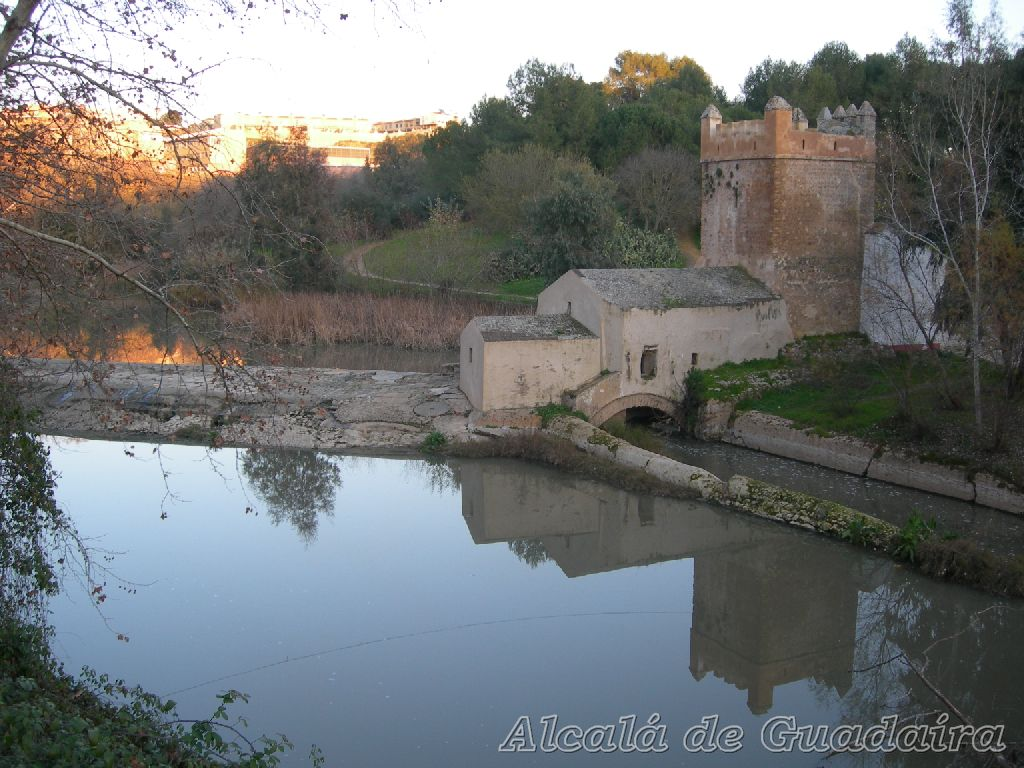
A Mill along the Guadaíra.

The river runs through the town of Alcalá de Guadaíra in the Seville's metropolitan area. The upper river watershed is from the land to the east and south-east of the town, it proceeds through the town and joins the Guadalquivir to the south of Seville. The river has for many years been heavily contaminated with the by-products of olive processing and other waste being dumped directly into the river.

Large amounts of foam and an unpleasant smell are not uncommon features of the river in the winter. In spite of this the river provides a haven for much wildlife as its banks are well covered with trees and vegetation. On the southern side of the river is a large area of picturesque stone pine woodland, Oromana, and this is a favourite site for weekend and fiesta day outings for both locals and tourists.

== See also ==
- List of rivers of Spain
