= David H. King Jr =

American constructor (1849–1916)

David H. King Jr.
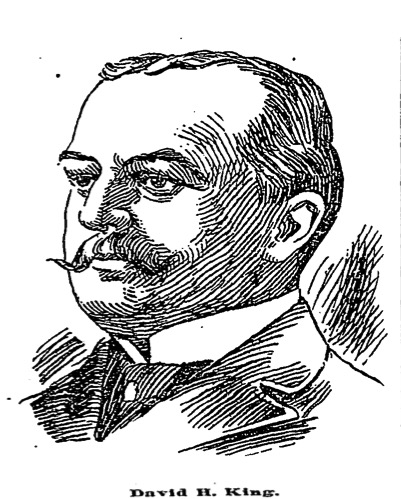
- Born: 1849; New York
- Died: April 20, 1916 (aged 66–67); New York
- Occupations: Contractor, developer, hotelier, investment banker, President of the New York City Park Commission, art collector
- Years active: 1870–1905
- Era: Gilded Age
- Title: President of the New York City Park Commission
- Board member of: Metropolitan Opera House Company, Knickerbocker Trust Company, New York City Park Commission, New York Dock Company
- Children: 4
- Father: David H. King
- Relatives: Alexi Lubomirski (great-great grandson)

David Hazlitt King Jr. (1849 – April 1916) was a prominent Gilded Age constructor, developer, hotelier, investment banker, art collector, President of the New York City Park Commission, and one of the initial Directors of the Metropolitan Opera House Company of New York. King is known for the assembly of the Statue of Liberty as well as the building of its plinth, constructing Washington Square Arch and Stanford White's Madison Square Garden.

== Early life ==
King was born in New York City in 1849, the son of David H. King, a wealthy property owner of Lower East Side tenements. Having been educated in New York City, which had prepared him for college, King decided to pursue a business career early on instead and in 1870 became a contractor.

== Career ==
=== Early career ===
David H. King Jr. started his building career in masonry and became a general contractor. In 1877 the architects Charles William Clinton and James W. Pirrson commissioned King to do the masonry work for their Queen Insurance Company Building (37–39 Wall Street). In 1878, when apartments were associated with tenements rather than homes to the financially comfortable, Miers Coryell commissioned the then up-and-coming architect Bruce Price and King Jr. to erect an upper-middle-class Queen Anne apartment house at 21 East 21st Street. The names of the builder and the architect are still visible on either side of the date stone on the building. In the early 1880s when the idea of luxurious apartment living was picking up, a group of investors, Knickerbocker Apartment Company, purchased and demolished the mansion of the Knickerbocker Club on the southwest corner of 5th Avenue and 28th Street to build the Knickerbocker Apartment House. The company contracted King as a builder in 1882.

=== Statue of Liberty pedestal ===
King's involvement with the building of the pedestal of the Statue of Liberty started in 1882, when the American Committee on the Statue of Liberty appointed him as the head of the special committee within the executive committee, the Building and Mechanics' Exchange Committee, where he was responsible for collecting subscriptions for the building of the pedestal from the respective occupational groups. When the concrete base of the pedestal was completed in 1884, the executive committee outlined specifications for the stone pedestal and asked for proposals. However, as fundraising for the pedestal had been proving difficult and slow, and the received tenders exceeded what the committee could afford, Gen. Charles P. Stone, the engineer-in-chief of the pedestal proposed that only the facing of the statue be made of stone, the backing be entirely made of the best quality concrete. It was then that King offered to build the pedestal according to the original exterior design by Richard Morris Hunt and technical specifications of Gen. Stone for $132,500, "including the dressing of stone". King also promised that in no event was he going to charge more than the sum initially stipulated, and that he would return to the executive committee, as his contribution to the Statue fund any profits which he might have made on the work. On behalf of the committee, Stone signed a contract with King on May 16, 1884. Upon the completion of the pedestal in 1886, the American Committee for the Statue of Liberty contracted with King to assemble the Statue, which task he completed by October 23, 1886. On the day of the dedication of the Statue, October 28, 1886, King was in charge of all the arrangements on the then Bedloe's Island (renamed Liberty Island) and was one of the three men, with Auguste Bartholdi and Richard Butler, to be standing on the head of the Statue and holding a cord attached to the veil which had covered the Statue's face. King's son, Van Rensselaer Choate (b. 1880), standing below the three men, gave them a sign with a white handkerchief to pull the rope and remove the cloth.

=== 1880s and collaboration with George B. Post ===
From 1878 to 1881 King completed the Long Island Historical Society building on the corner of Pierrepoint and Clinton Streets, which was designed by George B. Post and is now the Center for Brooklyn History. This was the first time for terra-cotta to be used in place of stone, as the best fire-proof material then available. Professional relationship with Post which started on the Long Island Historical Building project was responsible for many of the city's most prominent buildings in the 1880s and early 1890s. In 1882, in only one year, King completed the construction of the G.B. Post's Mills Building at 15 Broad Street and Exchange Place, across from the New York Stock Exchange (torn down in 1925), then the largest, most expensive and luxurious office building ever erected in New York City. The Mills Building set a new standard by which other tall office buildings were judged in the city for more than a decade. From 1885 to 1887 King was a general constructor of a large extension to the Equitable Life Building (destroyed by fire in 1912), the headquarters of the Equitable Life Assurance Society of the United States, at 120 Broadway (including the removal of the mansard roof and replacing it with the eighth and ninth stories). Post designed the extension. In 1889 King completed an ambitious enlargement of the New York Times Building at 41 Park Row designed by Post, adding eight stories and new foundations while the operations at the Times preexisting quarters proceeded, and the printing presses remained in place. King "arrived at the conclusion that it [had been] perfectly feasible to carry on the entire business of the New York Times under what were abnormal conditions." Describing the new structure Harper's Weekly compared King to Aladdin, whose "pure magic" had been "accomplished [...] by the means of practical mechanical skill and [King's] own genius". The New York Times used the word "skyscraper" for the first time in the article reporting the expansion of 41 Park Row, thus, later on, the press referred to King as "the pioneer in skyscraper construction".

When Cornelius Vanderbilt II purchased two brownstone houses on the southwest corner of 57th Street and 5th Avenue to build his palatial mansion there he commissioned Post as an architect. In 1879, on Post's suggestion, the two buildings were not demolished, and material not sold, but instead King took them down, piecemeal, "every part having been previously marked and numbered" and reconstructed on the corner of Madison Avenue and 57th Street, another ground belonging to Vanderbilt, halving the costs of construction. In the early 1890s Vanderbilt decided to enlarge his already spacious residence, bought two "costly" brownstone houses so that his property could face 58th Street. He once again employed Post as an architect, hired the mansion designer Richard Morris Hunt as a consultant and entrusted the construction to King, first giving him eighteen months to complete the project (works started on March 1, 1892, Vanderbilt later extended by three months). Upon completion of the "largest and finest private residence in America" in 1893 (demolished 1927), styled loosely after Louis XII's wing of Château Royal de Blois, The New York Times dubbed King a "master mind" who had been fitted to fulfill Mr. Vanderbilt's wishes and praised his "system of work" as being "nearly perfect as human calculation could make it." King employed 600 men at times and pushed the work to the night. During the same time King oversaw the construction (1889–1895) of the opulent G. B. Post designed mansion, on the southeast corner of 57th Street across from the Vanderbilts' château, built for the New York railroad mogul Collis P. Huntington and his wife Arabella Yarrington Worsham Huntington (demolished 1926).

In 1889 and 1890 Charles William Clinton worked with King yet again, this time with King as the general contractor, on two office buildings, the new eight-story quarter for the Farmers' Loan and Trust Company at 16–22 William Street and the Mechanics' National Bank at 37–39 Wall Street.

=== 1890s and collaboration with Stanford White ===
Strong and continuous collaboration with the star architect Stanford White of the architectural firm of McKim, Mead & White, marks the 1890s in King's career. The fruitful cooperation gave the city many of its landmark buildings. In 1889-1890 King built one of the earliest and most interesting structures designed by McKim, Mead & White – Madison Square Garden II – on Madison Square, at East 26th Street and Madison Avenue (demolished 1925), dubbed by the press "the largest hall of public entertainment in the world" at that time. Following King's success with the plinth of the Statue of Liberty, in April 1890, a committee of citizens, formed to raise funds and commission a permanent replacement of the then wood and plaster Washington Square Arch (1889), designed by Stanford White, awarded King the contract for building the Washington Square Arch, "exclusive of the curving upon it". King contracted James Sinclair & Co. for the marblework and David Angus for "the setting", while King's employees did the brick filling. During the structural construction, which took less than three years, the traffic between the two piers of the arch continued uninterrupted. On April 30, 1895, the day of the planned dedication of the Arch (moved to May 4 due to the weather), New York Tribune praised King for waiving his commissions (10%) "from public-spirited motives", and thus making "the largest individual subscription to the fund" for the Arch's erection. As upon the dedication of the Arch and its formal transfer to the city, King had already been recently appointed Park Commissioner, and the Arch was in a public park, King, the builder went through the ceremony of handing the Arch over to King, the Park Commissioner. In 1892 King signed a contract for the construction of McKim, Mead & White's New York Herald Building, completed in 1895 (demolished in 1921). With the plans for the Metropolitan Club announced by Stanford White in February 1892, in April 1892 McKim, Mead & White signed on King as the general contractor of what was dubbed by the press as "the handsomest clubhouse in the world". Between 1893 and 1895 King completed McKim, Mead & White designed headquarters of the now defunct Bowery Savings Bank at 130 Bowery.

On December 27, 1892, when the cornerstone of the Cathedral of St. John the Divine was laid, New York Evening World mentioned King as the cathedral's builder.

=== Developer and hotelier ===
King also developed apartment houses, tenements and hotels in Manhattan. He was a stockholder and builder of the "Randolph" (1885), an eight-story apartment house at 12 West 18th Street (never demolished). He owned and occupied one of the apartments in that building. Apart from typical working-class tenements of a density of two to four working families to a floor, in 1885 King developed 'Tenements' at 167–173 West 83rd Street, designed by McKim, Mead & White, meant for "professional and business people of modest means". The buildings had floor-through apartments with pink vestibule flooring and white-gray marble decorations on the ceilings and paneled doors. The biggest, yet unpredictably failed, development project King engaged in was the "King Model Houses", now known as "St. Nicholas Historic District" or "Striver's Row". 146 row houses and three apartment buildings built from 1891 to 1893, designed by Stanford White, Bruce Price, Clarence S. Luce and James Brown Lord, with the Equitable Life Assurance Company as mortgagor, were townhouses intended for upper-middle-class whites. The four blockfronts, each a unified streetscape, were and are still in West 138th and 139th Streets between Adam Clayton Powell Jr. (then Seventh Avenue) and Frederick Douglas Boulevards (then 8th Avenue). King, believing in "the future of the locality", wanted to "'Create a Neighborhood' independent of the surrounding influences" "on a large scale". The novelty King introduced was that the buyers could choose the designs of their homes: Italian Renaissance Revival (McKim, Mead & White) on the north side of the West 139th Street row, Colonial Revival (Bruce Price & Clarence S. Luce) on the south side of 139th Street and north side of West 138th Street row, finally Georgian Revival (James Brown Lord) on the south side of the West 138th Street row. Another novelty, in New York City at the time, was that the houses were built back to back so that they would share a central alleyway behind the homes accessible from the avenues and from small drives entered from the main streets. In 1899, on the pages of Architectural Record, Montgomery Schuyler praised retaining "the uniformity of a single block front" in King's development as a "redeeming feature of the brownstone period." The visionary character of the development also manifested itself in the fact that King was able to assure future purchasers "that no nuisances could spring up near these buildings and that one [needed] have no fear of a stable, factory, tenement or over-shadowing hotel rising beside his home." Since wealthy whites began to leave Harlem and economic depression hit in 1895 and Equitable would not sell to African-Americans, by 1895 it had to foreclose on the majority of homes. Equitable retained most of the buildings until 1919–20, when they became available for the African-Americans. Many of the houses became homes to prominent members of New York's black community, including surgeon Louis T. Wright, composer Will Marion Cook, singer and songwriter Eubie Blake, the founder of the Black Swan Record Company, Harry Pace, musician W. C. Handy, and boxer Harry Wills. As a reference to the aspirations of many of the black residents who had moved to the area in the 1920s the houses became known as Striver's Row.

As a hotelier King built and owned the Renaissance Hotel, at 512-514 Fifth Avenue (southwest corner of Fifth Avenue and 43rd Street), a seven-story opulent tenancy-based hotel for "high-class families and bachelors" completed in 1891. He resided in the hotel until his death in 1916. He was also the owner and a lessee of The Clarendon (called the Oxford), an apartment hotel built in 1905.

=== Other functions ===
King was a stockholder and first Director of the Metropolitan Opera House Company, created in 1880 to build the first Metropolitan Opera House, at 1411 Broadway, which opened its doors to the public on October 22, 1883.

During the presidency of John P. Townsend at the Knickerbocker Trust Company, King served as one of the bank's directors. In 1894 King was the Commissioner, and in 1895, the President of the New York City Park Commission. He was also the President of the New York Dock Company.

== Art collection ==
An avid art collector for almost three decades, King amassed an extraordinary collection of almost 200 cross-genre paintings that spanned from 16th to the 19th century. The collection also comprised Hepplewhite, Chippendale, Sheraton as well as French 17th and 18th century furniture, clocks, oriental rugs and many other important decorative objects. The painting collection comprised British, French, Dutch, Flemish and German old master paintings. The bulk of the nineteenth century paintings were French and included the adepts of academicism, realism, naturalism, romanticism, historicism, orientalism and, above all the School of Barbizon. However, the collection also included paintings by Americans of the time (Walter Gay, George Hitchcock, Daniel Ridgway Knight, John La Farge) and three paintings by a Norwegian Impressionist, Frits Thaulow. The collection is recorded in two catalogues of the sales that took place in 1896 and 1905.

Among the British old masters represented in the collection were 18th century painters including William Beechey, John Constable, John Singleton Copley, Francis Cotes, Thomas Gainsborough, John Hoppner, Cornelius Johnson (Cornelis Janssens van Ceulen), Godfrey Kneller, Thomas Lawrence, Peter Lely, John Opie, Henry Raeburn, Joshua Reynolds, George Romney, John Russell, J. M. W. Turner, and Richard Wilson.

French old masters in King's collection were represented by the painters of the Renaissance, Baroque, Rococo and Neoclassicism such as François Clouet, Philippe de Champaigne, François-Hubert Drouais, Jean-Germain Drouais, Jean-Baptiste Greuze, Nicolas Lancret, Nicolas de Largillière, Jeanne-Philiberte Ledoux, Charles André van Loo, Pierre Mignard, Jean-Marc Nattier, Antoine Vestier, Elisabeth-Louise Vigée Le Brun and Antoine Watteau.

Dutch Golden Age masterpieces in King Jr.'s collection included (possibly) Rembrandt's oil portrait of Jan Asselijn (1896 sale, lot 129), of whom only Rembrandt's etchings are known today, the well-known portrait of Catherina Gansneb van Tengnagel, wife of Andries Bicker, Amsterdam's burgomaster by Bartholomeus van der Helst, and paintings by Jan van Goyen and Adrian Hanneman.

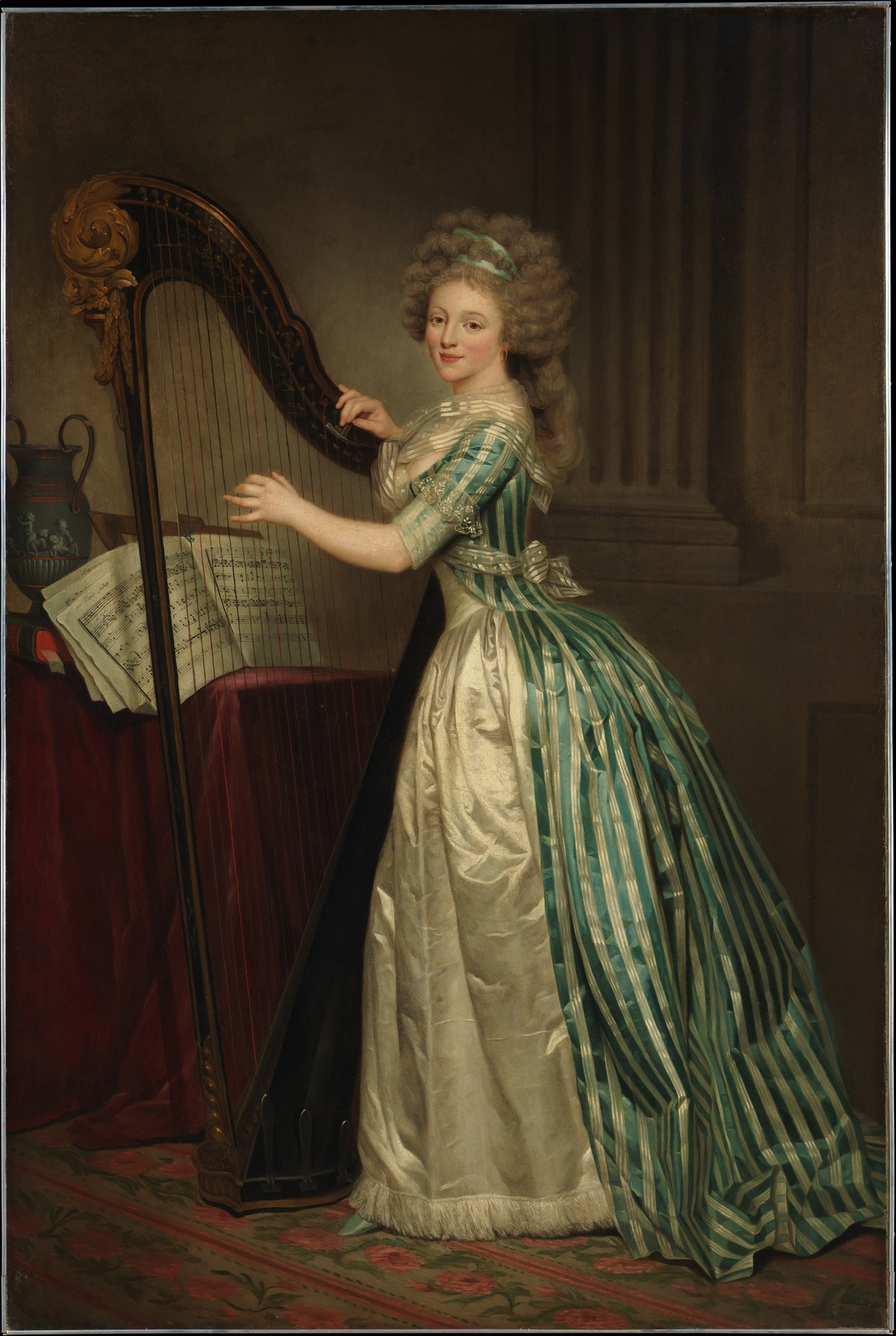
Rose Adélaïde Ducreux, Self-Portrait with a Harp, now at The Metropolitan Museum of Art

Flemish old masters were represented by Frans Pourbus the Elder, Frans Pourbus the Younger and Justus Sustermans.

The nineteenth century French artists in King's collection were: Jean Béraud, Étienne-Prosper Berne-Bellecour, William Adolphe Bouguereau, Jean-Charles Cazin, Charles Joshua Chaplin, Jean-Baptiste-Camille Corot, Charles-François Daubigny, Honoré Daumier, Édouard Detaille, Narcisse Virgilio Díaz, Marie Dieterle, Gustave Doré, Jules Dupré, Eugène Fromentin, Gustave Guillaumet, Henri-Joseph Harpignies, Jean Jacques Henner, Charles-Émile Jacque, Gustave-Jean Jacquet, Stanislas Lépine, Henry Lerolle, Léon Lhermitte, Luigi Loir, Ernest Meissonier, Adolphe Monticelli, Aimé Morot, Amble-Louis-Claude Pagnest, Théodule Augustin Ribot, Ferdinand Roybet, Constant Troyon, and Jehan Georges Vibert. Dutch nineteenth century painters in the collection were Jacob Maris, Anton Mauve, and Tony Offermans. Alberto Pasini, Francesco Carlo Rusca (Italian–Swiss), Filadelfo Simi, Gustavo Simoni, and Raffaello Sorbi were Italian painters representing nineteenth century art in King's collection. The German artists were Ludwig Knaus and Adolf Schreyer. Spanish artists of the time that King bought were Francisco Domingo Marqués, Martín Rico y Ortega, and Emilio Sala y Francés.

As reported by The New York Times, in May and September of 1895 King's health was deteriorating, to the point that he asked the Mayor of the City of New York, William Lafayette Strong, to "be relieved from the office" of the President of the New York City Park Commission. Perhaps, for the same reasons King decided to sell a handful of his art collection at the beginning of the following year. On February 17 and 18, 1896 two evening sales of paintings took place at Chickering Hall at 5th Avenue and 18th Street. Two sales of furniture and decorative objects took place respectively on the two consecutive afternoons of February 18 and 19 at the American Art Galleries in Madison Square South. Among the buyers were the French art dealer Paul Durand-Ruel and British art dealers, the Duveen Brothers. Another two sales of King's collection took place on March 31, 1905: antique furniture, oriental rugs, etchings, engravings and watercolors at American Art Galleries and paintings at Mendelssohn Hall at 113-119 West 40th Street.

Among paintings from King's collection now at museums are: Sir Peter Lely's Portrait of P. Lenéve, Alderman of Norwich (1905 sale, lot 55), George Romney's Portrait of Miss Matilda Lockwood (1905 sale, lot 56), Jean-Marc Nattier's Portrait of a Woman with her Dog (1905 sale, lot 62) all three in the collection of the Walters Art Museum in Baltimore, MD, Sir Joshua Reynolds' "Sir Patrick Blake, BART" (1905 sale, lot 70) at the USC Fisher Museum of Art in Los Angeles, Portrait of Isabella Clara Eugenia, Archduchess of Austria (ca. 1600)(1896 sale, lot 161), which Isabella Stuart Gardner bought for her Museum in Boston from Durand-Ruel a year after King's 1896 sale and Rose Adélaïde Ducreux's Self-Portrait at the Metropolitan Museum of Art, New York. With the passage of time some of the paintings from King's collection changed attributions, and the identities of the people portrayed became subject of debate. This happened to the Self-Portrait of Rose Adélaïde Ducreux which had been thought to be Élisabeth Vigée Le Brun's "Marquise de Saffray" (1905 sale, lot 69). Nattier's "Portrait of a Woman with her Dog" at the time of the 1905 sale (lot 62) was thought to depict the wife of Antoine-René de Voyer d'Argenson, marquis of Paulmy, minister of war under Louis XV and French ambassador to Poland. In 2010 the portrait of Thomas Thornhill, Esq. (1905 sale, lot 34) attributed to Romney in the King's collection re-emerged on the art market as by Pompeo Batoni. On April 8, 1937 Nicholas Aquavella, the founder of Aquavella Galleries, paid $4,100 for Turner's "Blois, on the Banks of the Loire", which had been in King's collection until 1896 (1896 sale, lot 140), at an auction at American Art Association Anderson Galleries, Inc. The painting fetched a record price at the auction and was a sensation for the press. Some other noteworthy works from the King's collection include Ludwig Knaus' "Coquette" from 1889 (1896 sale, lot 99), Jeanne-Philiberte Ledoux's "Bust of a Young Girl" (1905 sale, lot 47), Jean-Marc Nattier's "Madame de Roissy" (1905 sale, lot 40; the painting was set to be included in the catalogue raisonné of the works of Jean-Marc Nattier, published by the Wildenstein Institute as of 2007) and Sir Thomas Lawrence's "Portrait of Anne, Countess of Charlemont and her son James" (1896 sale, lot 154).

== Personal life ==
King lived in New York City and Newport, RI. Married to Mary, née Lyon, mother of his children; possibly, later in life, to Letitia. He had four children: Van Rensselaer Choate (1879–1927), Jeanne de Rham (1892–1965), Dorothy Flagg (1886–1973) and vicomtesse Ruth de Villiers du Terrage (1886–1972). His son, Col. Van Rensselaer Choate, Harvard '01, received the British DSC, and French Legion of Honor for serving in engineers during the First World War. He was a Division Superintendent of the Atlantic Coast Line Railroad and died during an earthquake in Kobe, Japan, while on an engineering mission. Through Van Rensselaer Choate, King Jr. became a father-in-law of Isabel Davis Rountree (died during childbirth, together with the only child), the daughter of George Rountree, one of the leaders of the Wilmington massacre of 1898 and a sponsor of the "Grandfather clause" aimed to disenfranchise the black population of North Carolina; later of a women's suffragist, Sarah Jewett Minturn, the granddaughter of a railroader and politician, Hugh J. Jewett and Elizabeth Guthrie, a descendant of Thomas Welles, Chad Brown, Abraham Pierson, and several other prominent colonial figures. Through his daughter, Dorothy, he became a father in law of Stanley Griswold Flagg III, of Philadelphia, PA. His daughter Ruth, an American and Parisian socialite, married vicomte Jean Maurice Marie Marc de Villiers du Terrage, a great-grandson of Édouard de Villiers du Terrage. Through Ruth and her daughter, Jeanne-Marie, duchesse de La Rochefoucauld, née de Villiers du Terrage, princess Lubomirska by first marriage (1921–2004), prince Ladislas Lubomirski (b. 1949), the current head of the Polish princely family House of Lubomirski, is King's great grandson.

== Legacy ==
Alexander Wood, a historian of American architecture and urbanism, credits King with revolutionizing and rationalizing construction in three important ways. First was reconceptualizing the construction of a building into a single "production process" overseen "from above", using charts and timekeepers, borrowing from the techniques developed in railroad construction. King was also the first one to ever use a sidewalk shed in New York City. This was important for the organization of the construction process, the flow of materials to the site, as by New York City law one could not store building materials on a sidewalk or in the streets. While the sidewalk sheds protected the pedestrians, their platforms provided a useful storage area for deliveries of building materials. Lastly, he pushed the preparation of construction to night-time, increasing the efficiency of the building process.

As subscriptions for civic projects, both from the wealthy and the general public, proved difficult in the last decades of the 19th century, by waiving his commissions and offering the return of profits he could have retained, King, driven by patriotic motives, made the completion of the important monuments that are now symbols of the city of New York.

King's pioneering and revolutionary role in the skyscraper construction and construction in general was equally important as that played by the most prominent architectural firms of the day.

"King Model Houses" which today form St. Nicholas Historic District, are now collectively recognized as visionary and much ahead of their times with regards to "the sense of forethought and consideration in land development" at the same time being one of the finest examples of the 19th century urban design in New York City. Their initial failure was a result of a "disastrous spurt of over-investing" and prevalent racism of the day. The houses were designated by the New York City Landmarks Preservation Commission in 1967, and listed on the National Register of Historic Places in 1975.

According to the press of the time, King left a fortune of $1 to "several millions".
