= Bowery Savings Bank Building =

The Bowery Savings Bank Building may refer to the following buildings operated by Bowery Savings Bank:

- 110 East 42nd Street
- Bowery Savings Bank Building (130 Bowery)
