= Jeanne-Philiberte Ledoux =

French painter

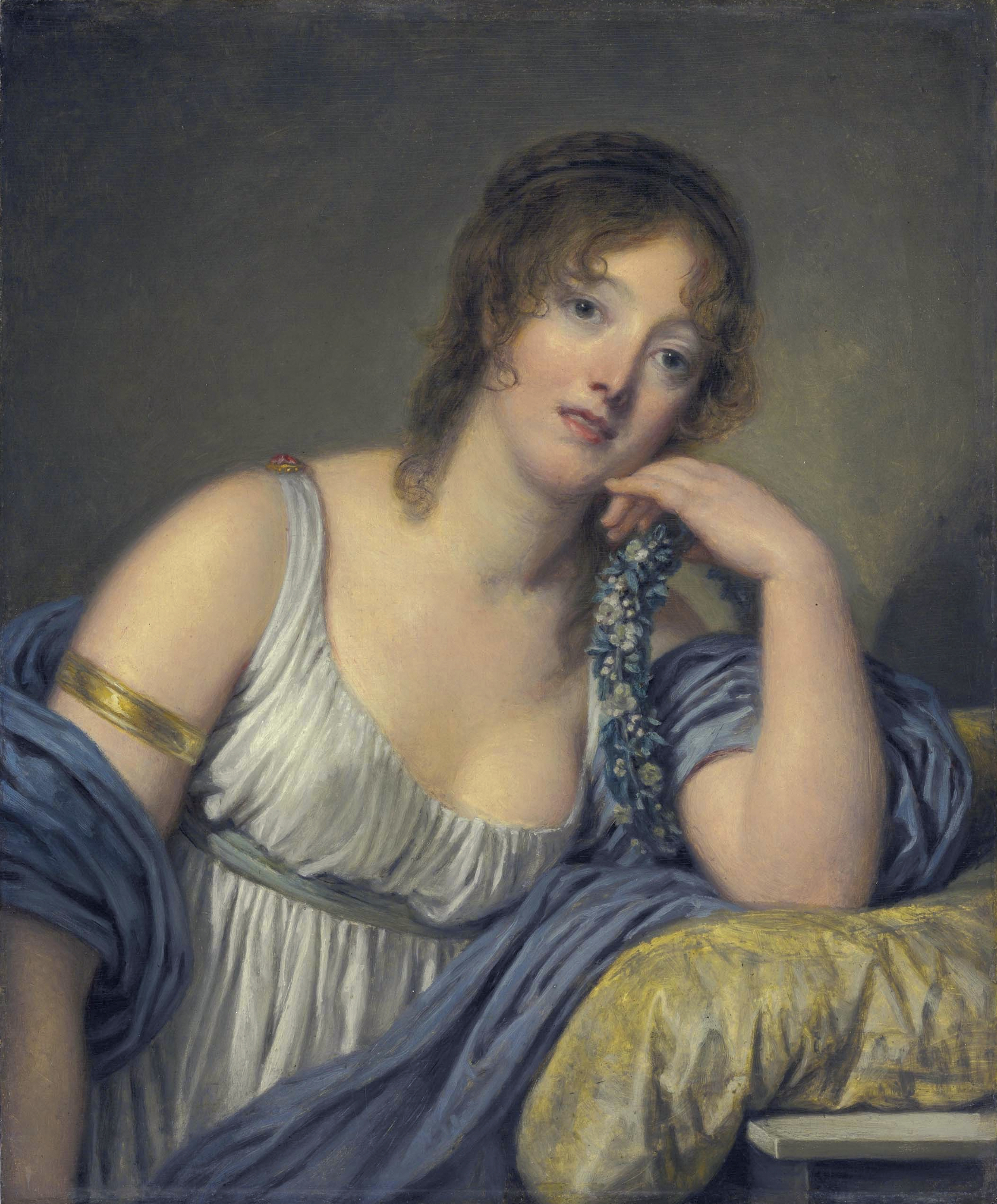
- Jeanne Philiberte Ledoux (Jean-Baptiste Greuze, ca. 1790)
- Born: 1767; Paris
- Died: 12 October 1840 (aged 72–73); Belleville

Jeanne-Philiberte Ledoux (1767 – 12 October 1840) was a French painter. Ledoux was born in Paris and took lessons from Jean-Baptiste Greuze. Her work was first seen in public in 1793, when she showed three paintings in the Salon: Painting at Rest, Little Girls at a Crossroads, and Concealed Love. She is known for miniatures and portraits and exhibited in the Paris Salons from 1793 to 1819, in which she was a frequent exhibitor. Only one work attributed to Ledoux is signed, and none are dated.

Ledoux died in Belleville.

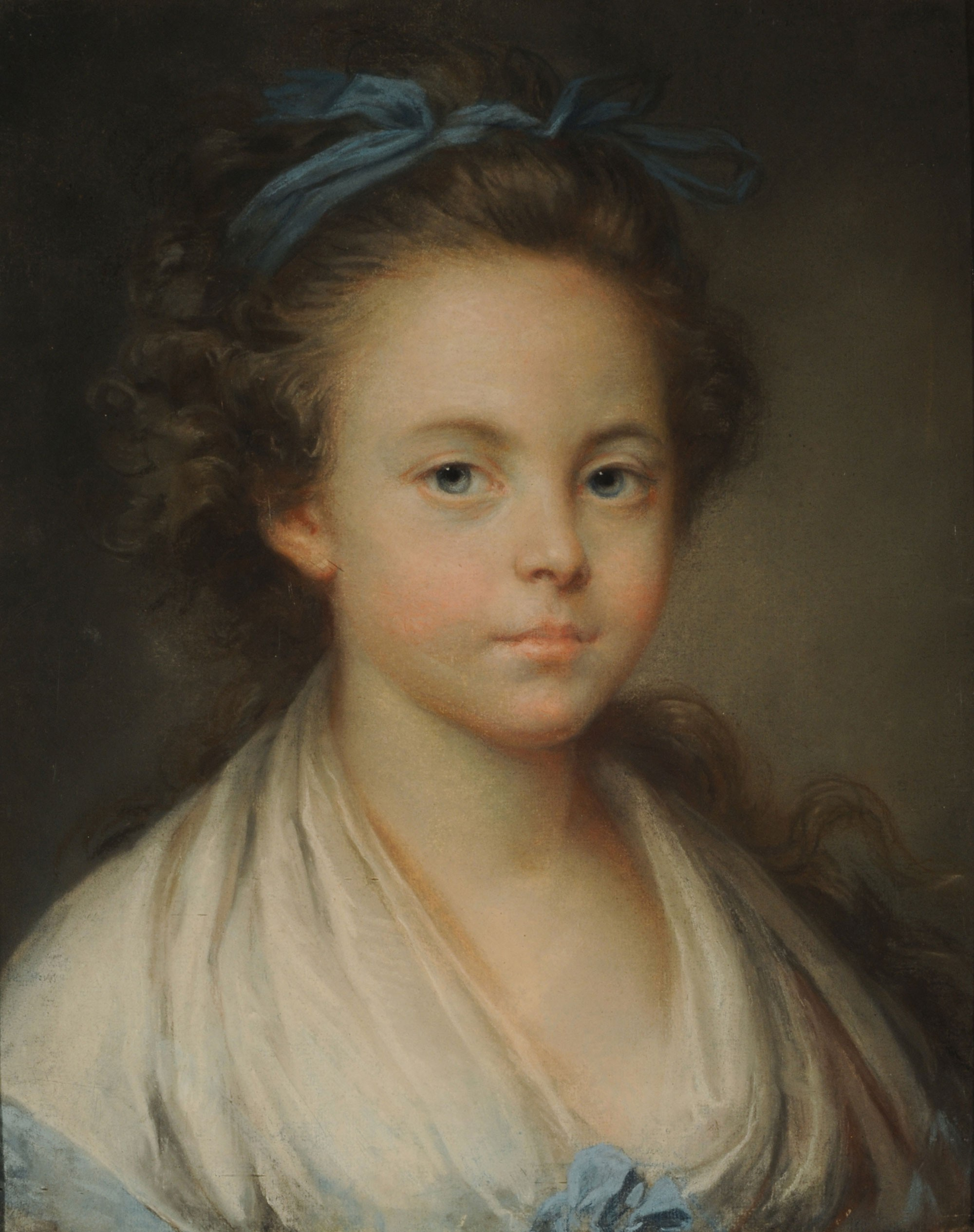
Portrait of a girl

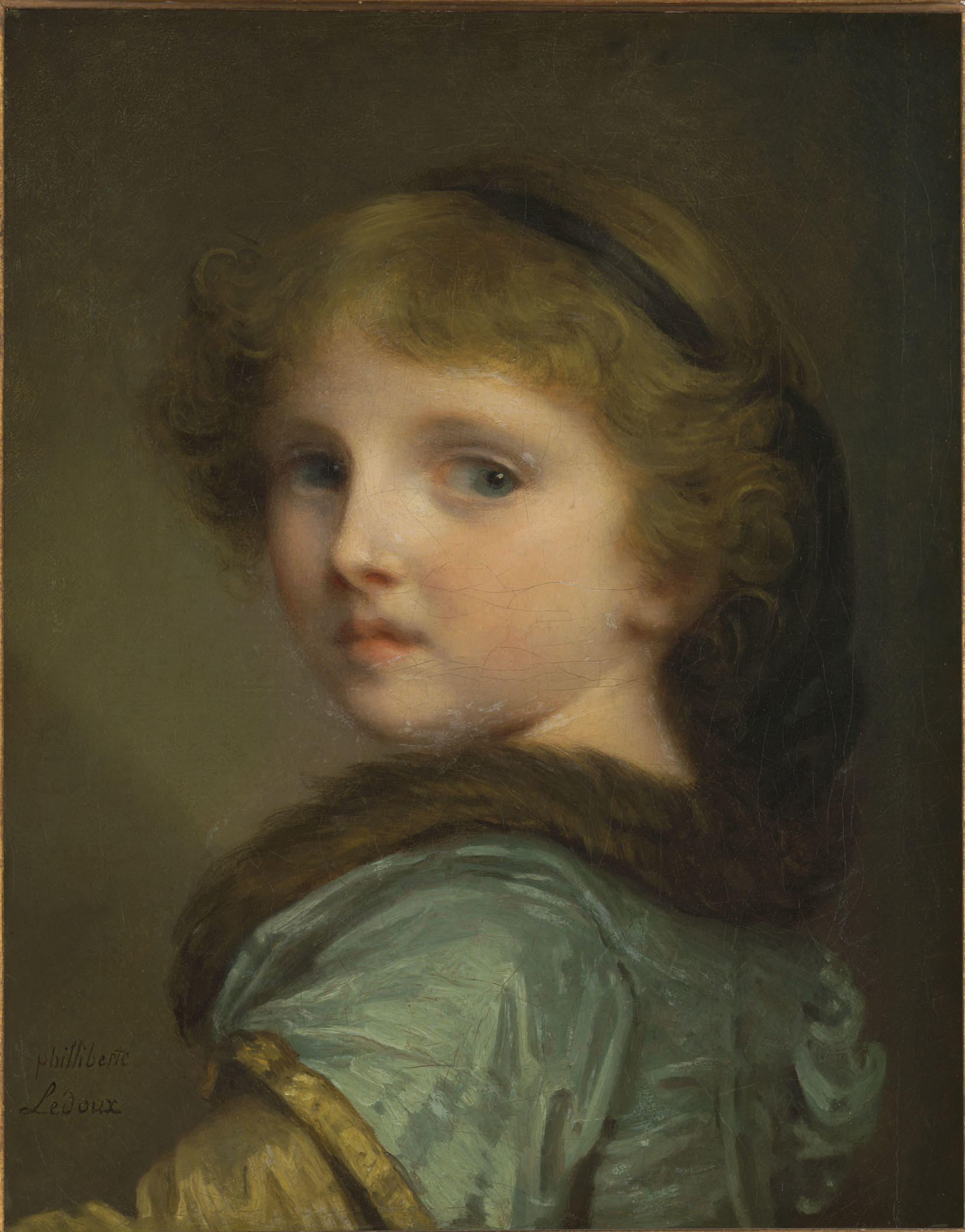
Bust of a young girl

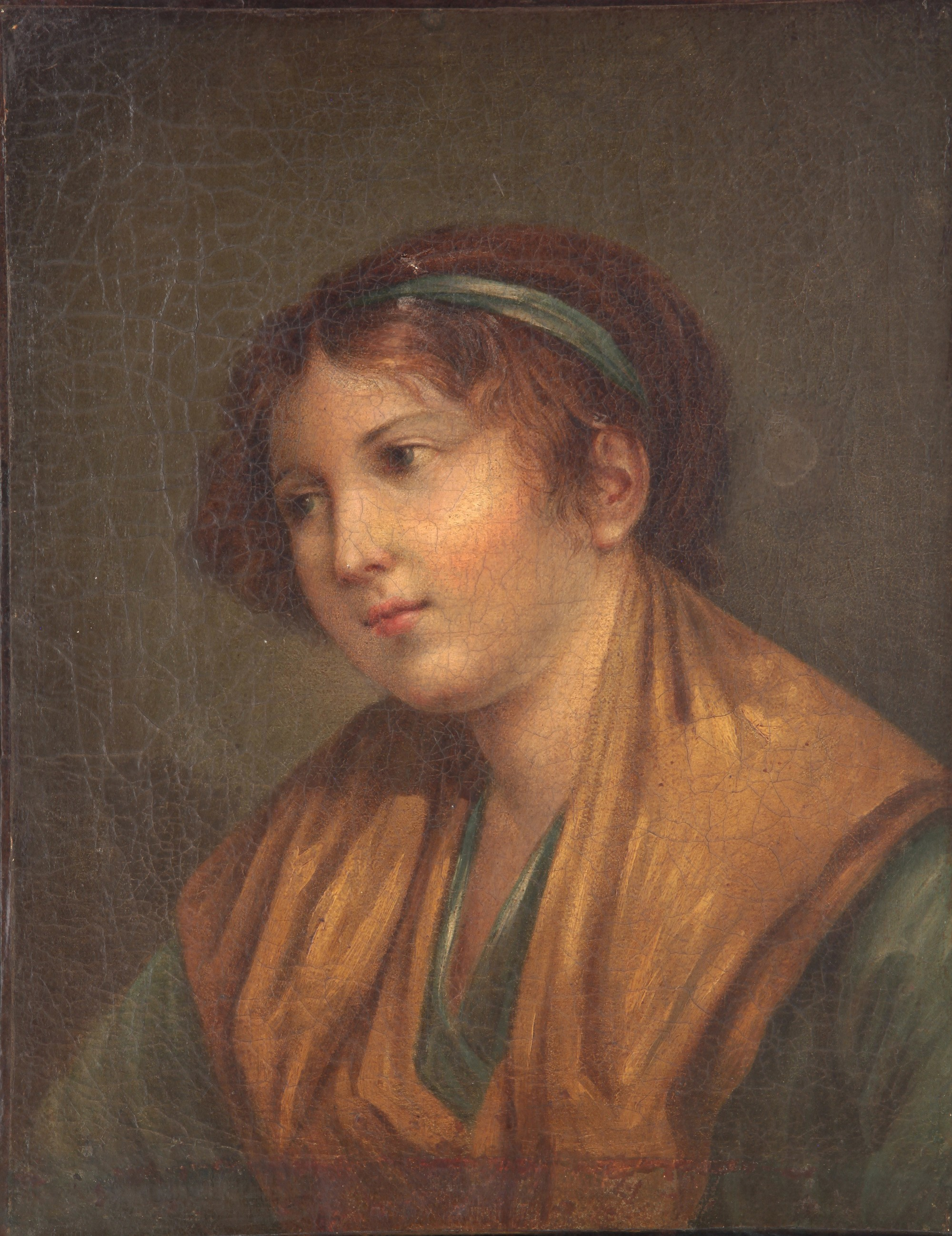
Bust of girl

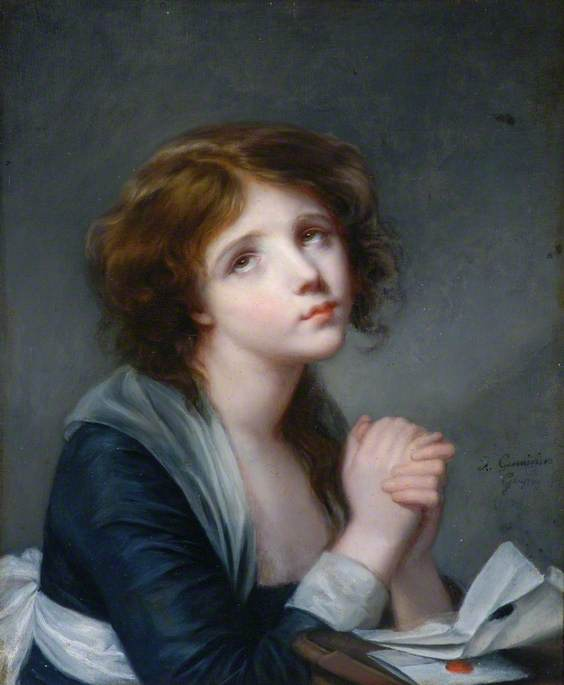
A Girl in Prayer
