= Maria Martinetti =

Italian painter

Maria Martinetti Stiavelli
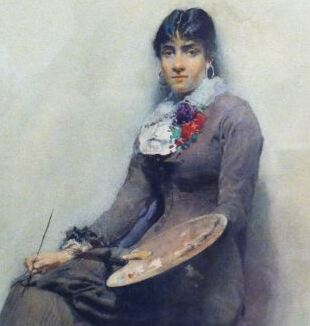
- Born: Maria Martinetti; 1864; Rome, Kingdom of Italy
- Died: 1937; Rome, Kingdom of Italy
- Education: Gustavo Simoni
- Known for: Painting
- Notable work: Malaria (1887)
- Movement: Realism, Orientalism
- Spouse: Giacinto Stiavelli (m. 1896–1919)
- Awards: Silver medal – Exposition Universelle (1889), Paris

Maria Martinetti (1864–1937) was an Italian painter. She was a student of Gustavo Simoni. She lived and exhibited in Italy and France. In 1890 she moved to the United States. She is known for her genre paintings.

== Biography ==
Martinetti was born in 1864. She attended the Academy of Fine Arts in Rome. She went on to exhibit her paintings in Rome, Venice and Paris. In 1890 she emigrated to the United States. Martinetti exhibited her work at the Palace of Fine Arts at the 1893 World's Columbian Exposition in Chicago, Illinois.

She died in 1937 in Rome.

== Gallery ==
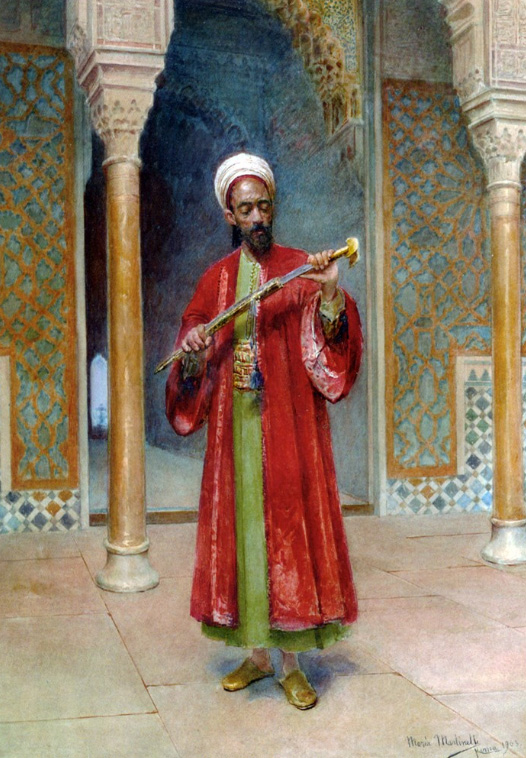
Maria Martinetti The Palace Guard, 1903

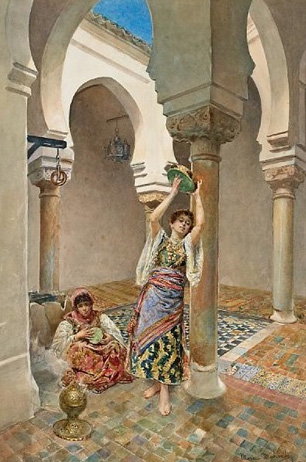
Maria Martinetti Two female musicians in a courtyard, 1891
