= Gustavo Simoni =

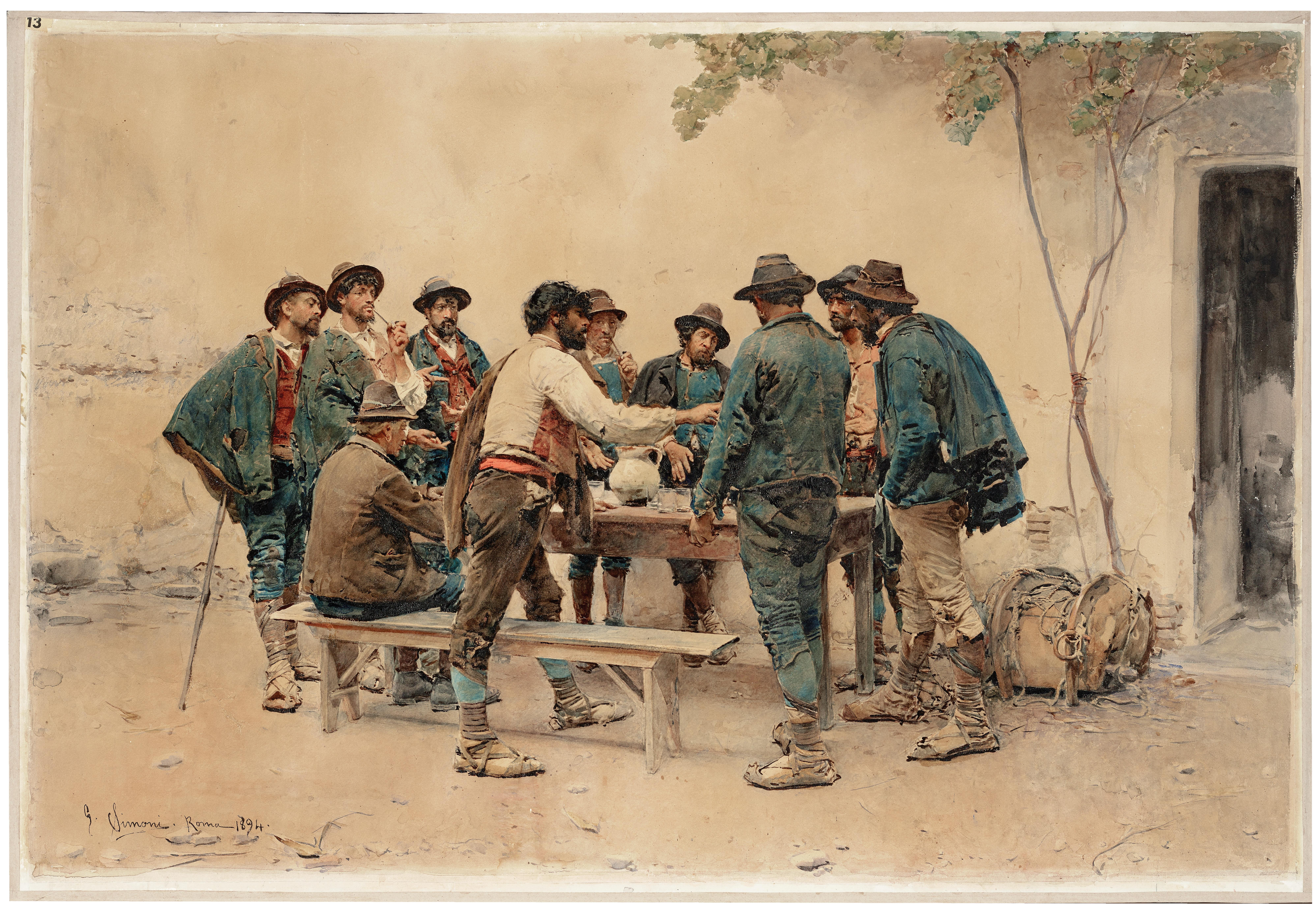
The Morra Players

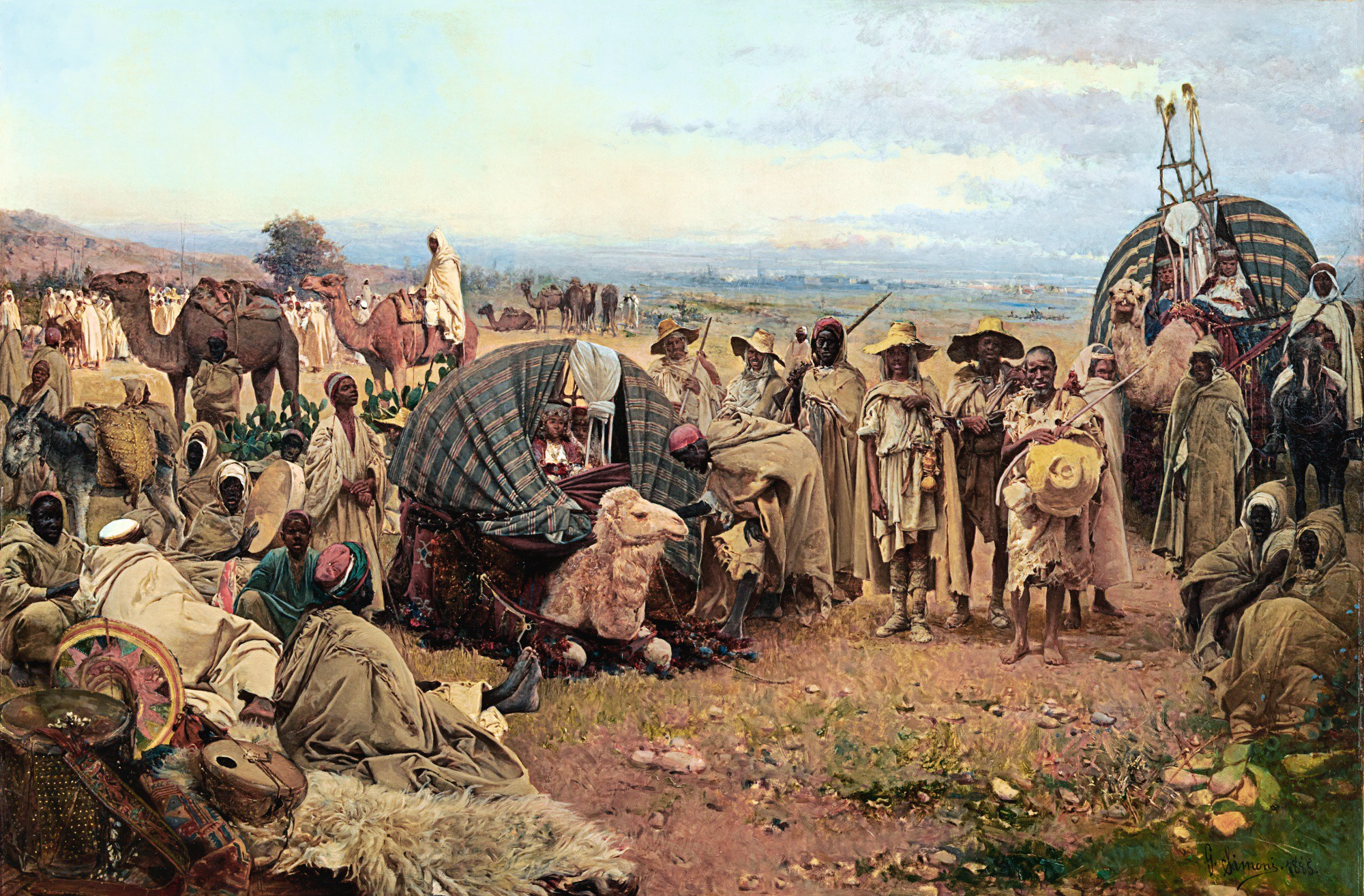
The Halt of the Caravan

Gustavo Simoni (5 November 1845, in Rome – 10 May 1926, in Palestrina) was an Italian painter, watercolorist and art teacher. He is best known for his Orientalist scenes.

== Biography ==
His father, Antonio, was a barber who originally came from Pratica di mare. He had a younger brother, Scipione who, with his encouragement, also became a painter.

beginning in 1877, he travelled extensively, visiting France, Spain and, especially, North Africa, where he made several lengthy stays in Morocco. In 1889, he won a gold medal at the Salon for his monumental depiction of the burning of Persepolis. King Umberto I was among his regular clients. He was also a member of the Accademia di San Luca.

In the 1890s, he opened a studio in Paris and started a school for Orientalist painting in Rome. When he returned there, he lived in farmhouse that had been renovated by his son-in-law, the architect Francesco La Grassa. He had five children altogether, three of whom became painters: Paolo (1882-1960), Mario (1885-1953), who specialized in still-lifes, and Ettore (1895-?), who emigrated to Arizona and painted desert landscapes.

In addition to his Orientalist scenes, he created genre scenes, plus highly imaginative historical scenes from ancient Rome and the 17th century. the 18th century. He was one of the original members of the Associazione degli Acquarellisti romani. His works, however, are generally more familiar among watercolorists in England than in Italy.

Outside of Italy, his works may be seen in Glasgow, Leipzig, Melbourne and New York. Maria Martinetti and Filiberto Sbardella were, perhaps, his best known students.

== Sources ==
- Gian Francesco Lomonaco. Acquerelli dell'Ottocento, La Società degli Acquarellisti a Roma, 1987
- Renato Mammucari, Acquerellisti romani: suggestioni neoclassiche, esotismo orientale, decadentismo bizantino, realismo borghese, Edimond, 2001 ISBN 978-88-500-0142-2
