= Francisco Domingo Marqués =

Spanish painter (1842–1920)

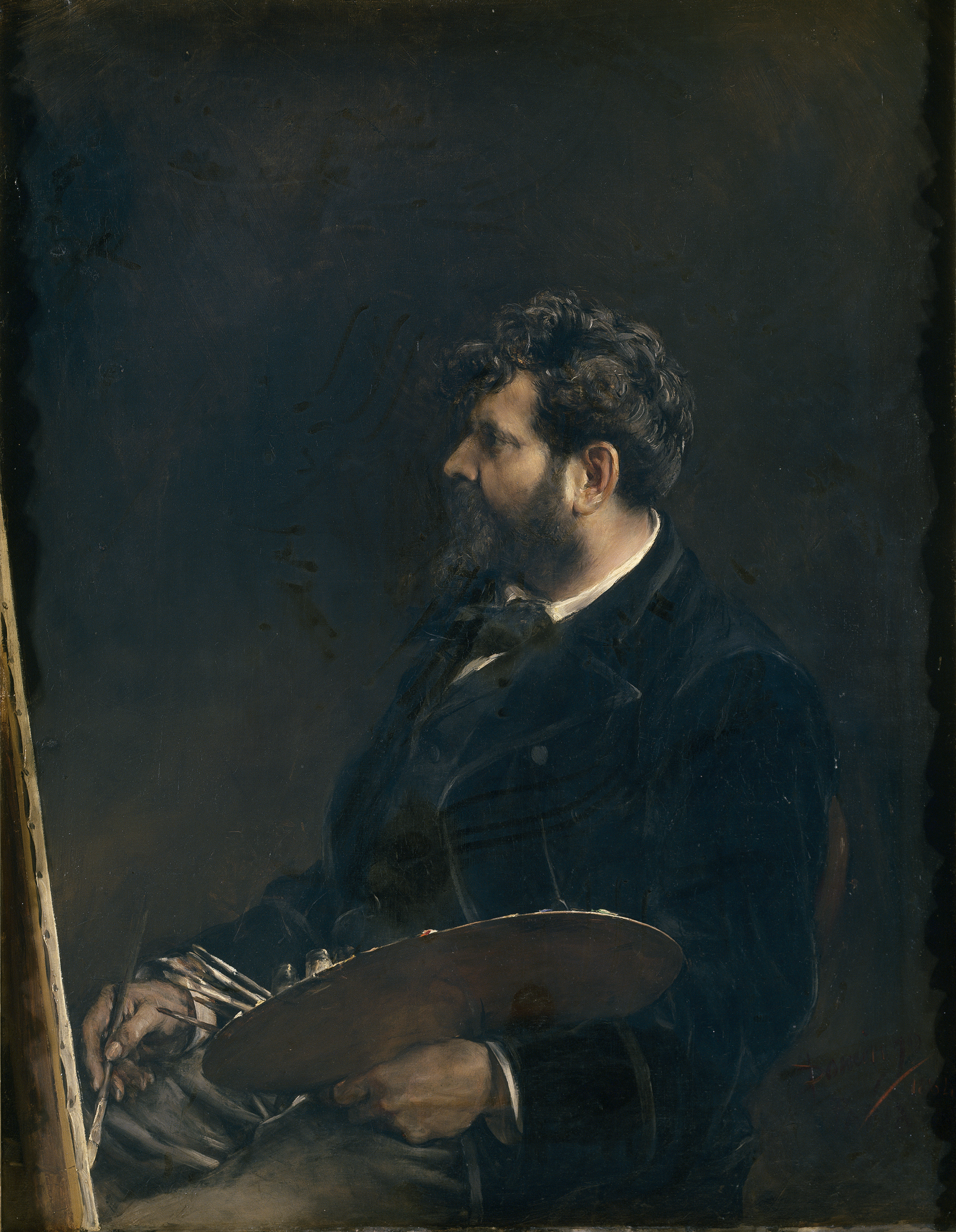
Self-portrait (1884)

Francisco José Domingo y Marqués (12 March 1842 – 22 July 1920) was a Spanish painter in the Eclectic style.

== Biography ==
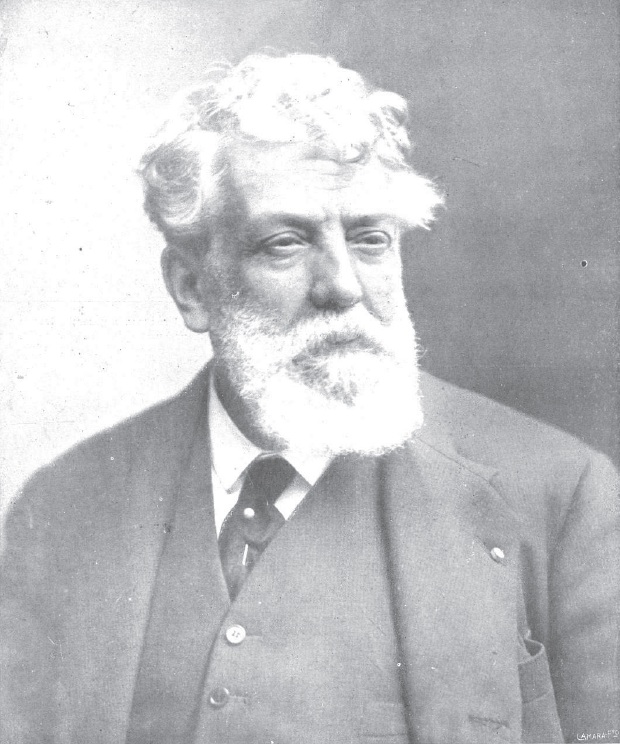
Domingo in his later years. Photograph by Kaulak

He was born in Valencia, where he began his studies at the Real Academia de Bellas Artes de San Carlos, as a student of Rafael Montesinos y Ramiro , a great admirer of José de Ribera, whose works Domingo copied as his first exercises. In 1864, he moved to Madrid to continue his studies at the Real Academia de Bellas Artes de San Fernando with Federico de Madrazo. Three years later, he was awarded a pension by the "Diputación Provincial de Valencia" (the local government) to continue his studies in Rome. He went there in 1868, where he obtained a position in the workshop of Eduardo Rosales.

While there, he sent his works to the National Exhibition of Fine Arts, winning several awards for his Baroque-style paintings. Suffering from the effects of malarial fever, he returned to Spain and taught at the Academia de San Carlos for a year. His portrait of Santa Clara praying won First Prize at the Exhibition of 1871. That same year, his pension was cancelled, as he showed no inclination to return to Rome. As a result, he moved to Madrid, where he found work decorating various buildings, including the palace of Eduardo, Duque de Bailén.

He married in 1874 and, the following year, moved to Paris, where his works consisted largely of detailed historical genre scenes and portraits for high society patrons, many of whom were former clients of Mariano Fortuny. During this time, he absorbed some elements from the style of Meissonier as well as brightening his palette under the influence of the Impressionists. His paintings were bought by Paris based art dealer Etienne Haro. He also made contacts with art dealers in the United States. William Henry Vanderbilt and Augustin Daly were among those who bought his paintings.

Benezit Dictionary of Artists His Benezit entry is entered as "Domingo y Marques (Francisco)" The entry shows him winning the Prix de Rome 1867. Professor of The Academy of St Charles, Valencia, 1868. Member of the Academy Royale of Antwerp, 1889. It also records some of his works and sales. The Etienne Haro sales of 1892 and 1897 record the two studies titled a Votre Sante, (see the first A Votre Propre Sante below)

In 1914, at the start of World War I, he returned to Madrid, moving in with his son Roberto (1883-1956), who was also an artist; widely known for his paintings of bullfights. Three years later, he became a member of the Academia de San Fernando. In 1918, his work was the subject of a retrospective and tribute in his native Valencia. He was also a recipient of the "Civil Order of Alfonso X, the Wise". He died in Madrid, aged 78. Later that same year The Royal Academy exhibited three of his paintings titled: Portrait of a Lady reading, Study of the head of my son Marcelo and The Cobbler (see below). The Royal Academy describe him as a typically Spanish artist imitating the old Spanish masters and Goya.

== Selected paintings ==
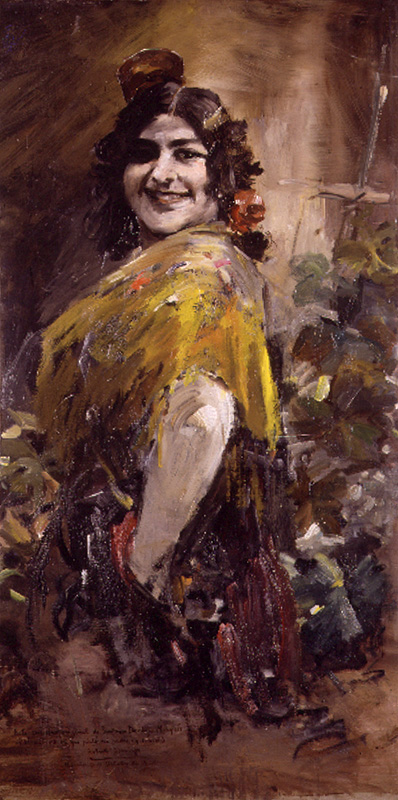
Andalusian (1920)

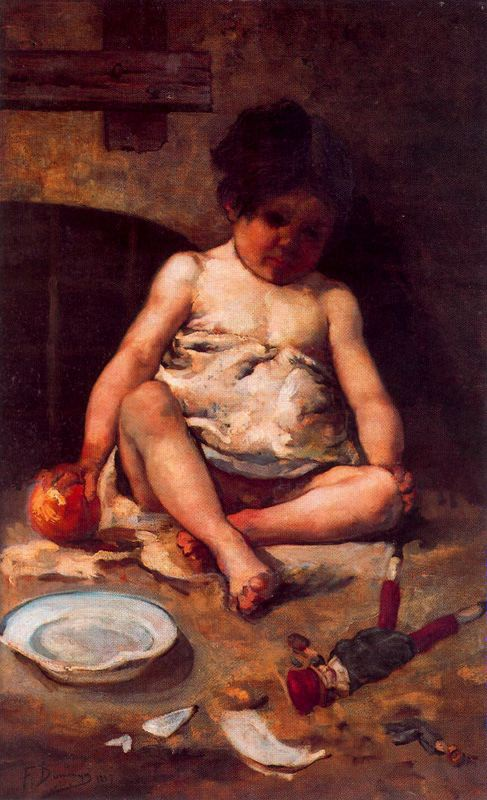
Figure of a Child (1887)

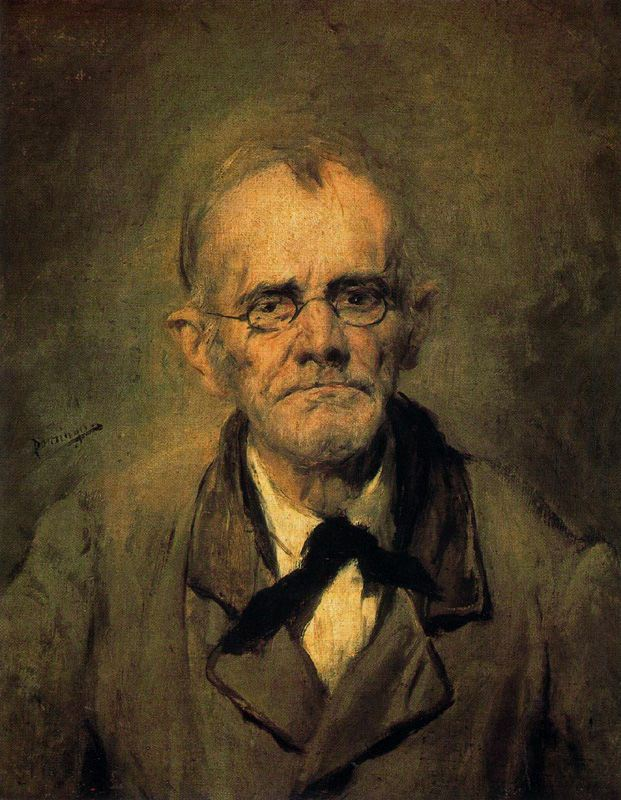
The Cobbler (1870/75)

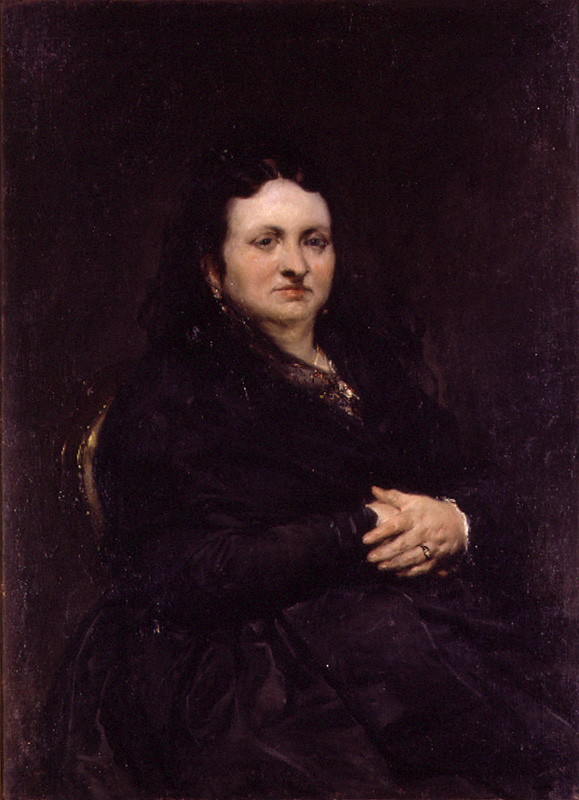
Doña Carmen Cervera (1870)

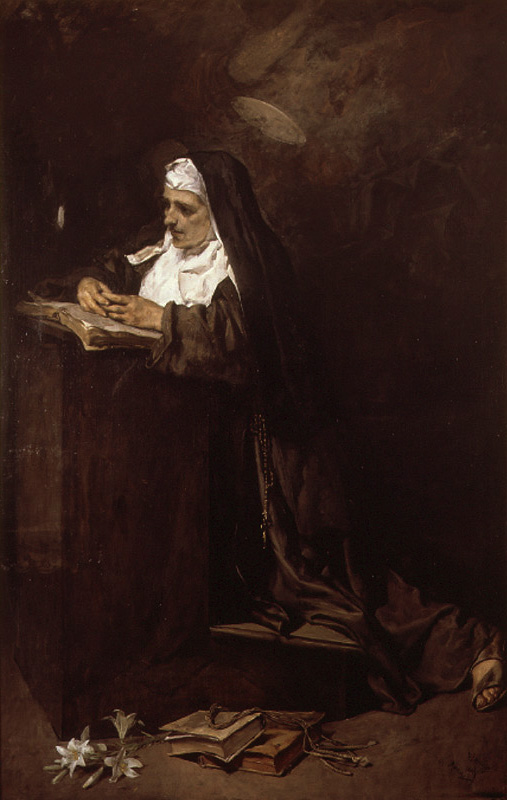
Santa Clara (1869)

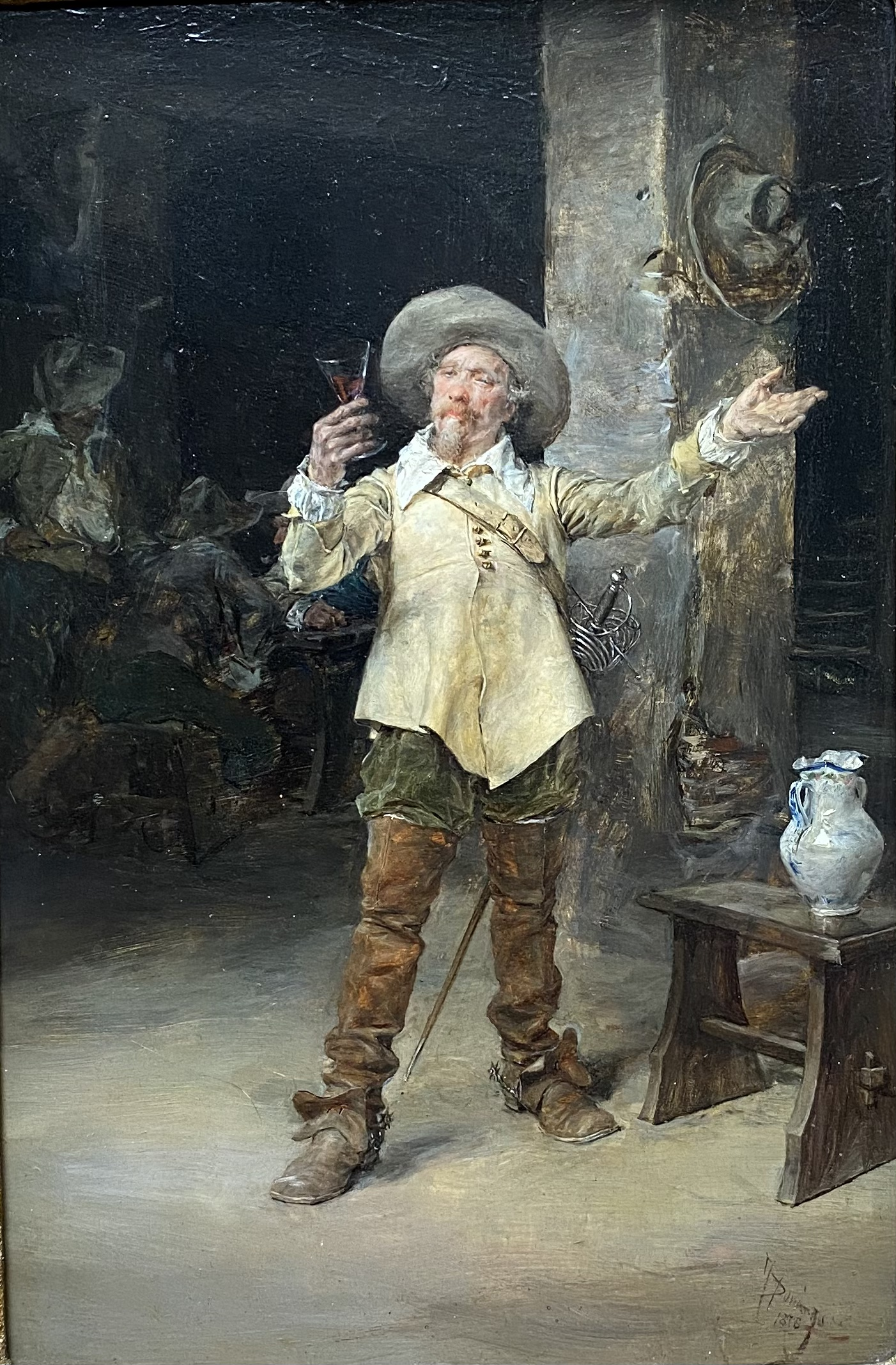
A Votre Propre Sante (1876)
