= Bowery Savings Bank Building (130 Bowery) =

Historic bank building in Manhattan, New York

- Bowery Savings Bank
- U.S. National Register of Historic Places
- U.S. Historic district – Contributing property
- New York State Register of Historic Places
- New York City Landmark
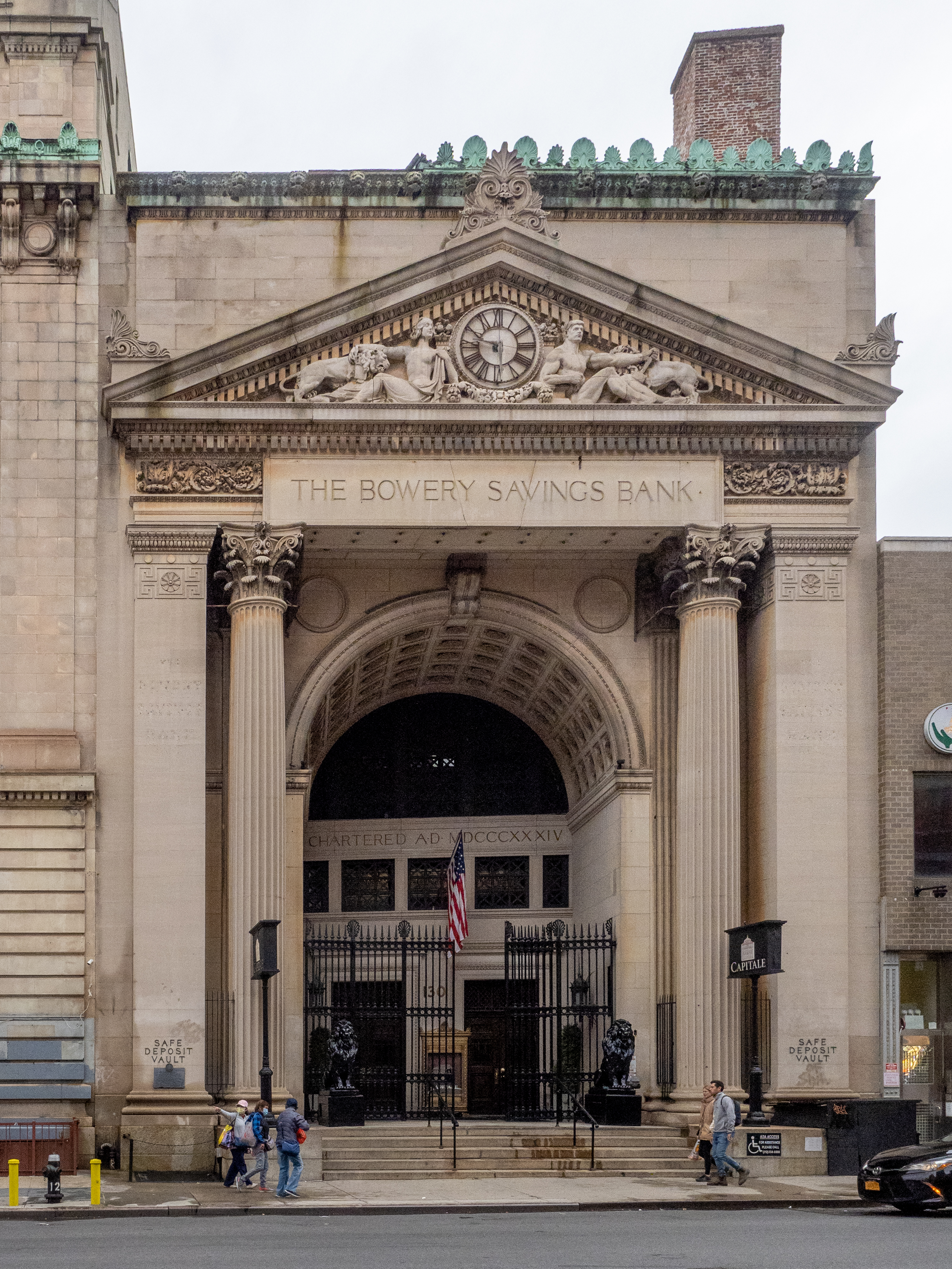
- Location: 130 Bowery; Manhattan, New York
- Coordinates: 40°43′08″N 73°59′44″W
- Built: 1893–1895
- Built by: David H. King, Jr.
- Architect: Stanford White
- Part of: The Bowery Historic District (ID13000027)
- NRHP reference No.: 80002672
- NYSRHP No.: 06101.000566
- NYCL No.: 0184, 1911

Significant dates
- Added to NRHP: April 23, 1980
- Designated CP: February 20, 2013
- Designated NYSRHP: June 23, 1980
- Designated NYCL: April 19, 1966 (exterior), August 23, 1994 (interior)

The Bowery Savings Bank Building, also known as 130 Bowery, is an event venue and former bank building in the Little Italy and Chinatown neighborhoods of Lower Manhattan in New York City. Constructed for the defunct Bowery Savings Bank from 1893 to 1895, it occupies an L-shaped site bounded by Bowery to the east, Grand Street to the south, and Elizabeth Street to the west. The Bowery Savings Bank Building was designed by Stanford White of McKim, Mead & White. Since 2002, it has hosted an event venue called Capitale. The building's facade and interior are New York City designated landmarks, and the building is listed on the National Register of Historic Places.

The building's basement is clad with a granite water table, while the superstructure is clad with Indiana limestone. The exterior features Corinthian columns and sculpted pediments by Frederic MacMonnies. The main entrance is through a triumphal arch on the relatively narrow Bowery elevation, which is designed to resemble a Corinthian temple. The Grand Street and Elizabeth Street elevations contain Corinthian pilasters, and there is a secondary entrance portico on Grand Street. The interior was designed to give the impression of a Roman temple, with a waiting room to the east and a banking room to the west. Both spaces are decorated with mosaic-tile floors and marble colonnades, and the banking room also features a double-height coffered ceiling with a square skylight. A bank vault and offices for the president and secretary were to the west of the banking room, while a director's room was placed above the waiting room.

The Bowery Savings Bank was founded in 1834, occupying a house at 128 Bowery; this structure was replaced with a larger building in 1853. The bank acquired additional land through the late 19th century and announced plans for a new headquarters in 1891. Construction on the banking room commenced in May 1893, and the banking hall opened in June 1894. The waiting room was built as part of a second phase that was completed in 1895. The building remained relatively unchanged in the 20th century as the Bowery Savings Bank continued to expand. The Bowery Savings Bank's successor company, Greenpoint Bank, sold the building to Jeffrey Wu in 2000. The Capitale event venue opened in October 2002, and the building was sold again in 2017 and 2025.

== Site ==
The Bowery Savings Bank Building is on 130 Bowery, in the Little Italy and Chinatown neighborhoods of Lower Manhattan in New York City. The L-shaped building is bounded by Bowery to the east, Grand Street to the south, and Elizabeth Street to the west. It wraps around the Bowery Bank of New York Building at 124 Bowery, which occupies the northwest corner of Bowery and Grand Street. It consists of two primary sections: an eastern portion on Bowery, measuring 50 feet (15 m) wide and 100 feet (30 m) deep, and a western portion on Grand and Elizabeth Streets, measuring 100 by 100 feet. This gives the site a total depth of 200 feet (61 m) between Bowery and Elizabeth Street. The site covers 15,002 square feet (1,393.7 m^{2}). Because of the street grid of the surrounding neighborhood, none of the building's sides are parallel.

The current building is the third to be built for the Bowery Savings Bank on the same site. It was built on an assemblage of six land lots: two on Bowery and four on Elizabeth and Grand Streets. The lot at 128 Bowery was previously occupied by the Butchers' and Drovers' Bank, which had been founded in 1830 and later became the Bowery Savings Bank's first building on the site. This structure had been torn down to make way for the Bowery Savings Bank's second building, which opened in 1853. The four lots on Elizabeth and Grand Streets had contained houses until 1893.

== Architecture ==
The Bowery Savings Bank Building was designed by Stanford White of McKim, Mead & White and was built between 1893 and 1895. The contractor was David H. King Jr. It was one of three major bank buildings that White designed during the 1890s recession, the others being the New York Life Building at 346 Broadway and the State Savings Bank of Detroit. The building is designed in the Classical Revival and Beaux-Arts styles. According to architectural historian Leland M. Roth, the building was "designed to stimulate and elevate", similarly to McKim, Mead & White's designs for the Boston Public Library and the World's Columbian Exposition.

=== Facade ===
The building's facade is split into two sections: the Bowery elevation and the connected Grand Street and Elizabeth Street elevations. The exterior features Corinthian columns and sculpted pediments by Frederic MacMonnies. According to Stanford White's descendants, the building's exterior "invoked the authority of ancient Rome" with its design details, including porticos on Bowery and on Grand Street. Wrought iron grilles are also placed in front of numerous windows and doors. The building's basement is clad with a granite water table, while the superstructure is clad with Indiana limestone. In addition, the roof is largely covered with Roman tile, except above the banking room, where there is a glass skylight with metal ribs.

==== Bowery ====
The main entrance is through the relatively narrow Bowery elevation. The facade consists of a triumphal arch, which in turn is surrounded by a frame that is designed like a Corinthian temple. The spandrels of the arch contain roundel motifs, while the arch's keystone is a console bracket. The entrance is recessed within the arch, accessed by a set of steps leading up from Bowery. The space under the arch contains mosaic floors and a coffered ceiling, while the entrance itself is via two small doors. The steps are flanked by a pair of Corinthian columns and flat pilasters. Iron lamps and bronze signs are also placed next to the entrance.

Above the columns and pilasters is an architrave with acroteria. The center of the architrave contains a tablet surrounded by floral motifs; the words "The Bowery Savings Bank" are inscribed on the tablet in capital letters. The architrave is topped by a triangular pediment with a sculpture by MacMonnies. The pediment depicts a clock flanked by two figures, each accompanied by a lion. The figures, depicting a man and woman, represent the concepts of time and industry. The attic of the Bowery elevation rises above the pediment. There are three anthemion-shaped acroteria on the attic: one on either end of the facade and one directly above the center of the pediment. In addition, the attic is decorated with lions' masks and antefixes.

==== Grand Street and Elizabeth Street ====
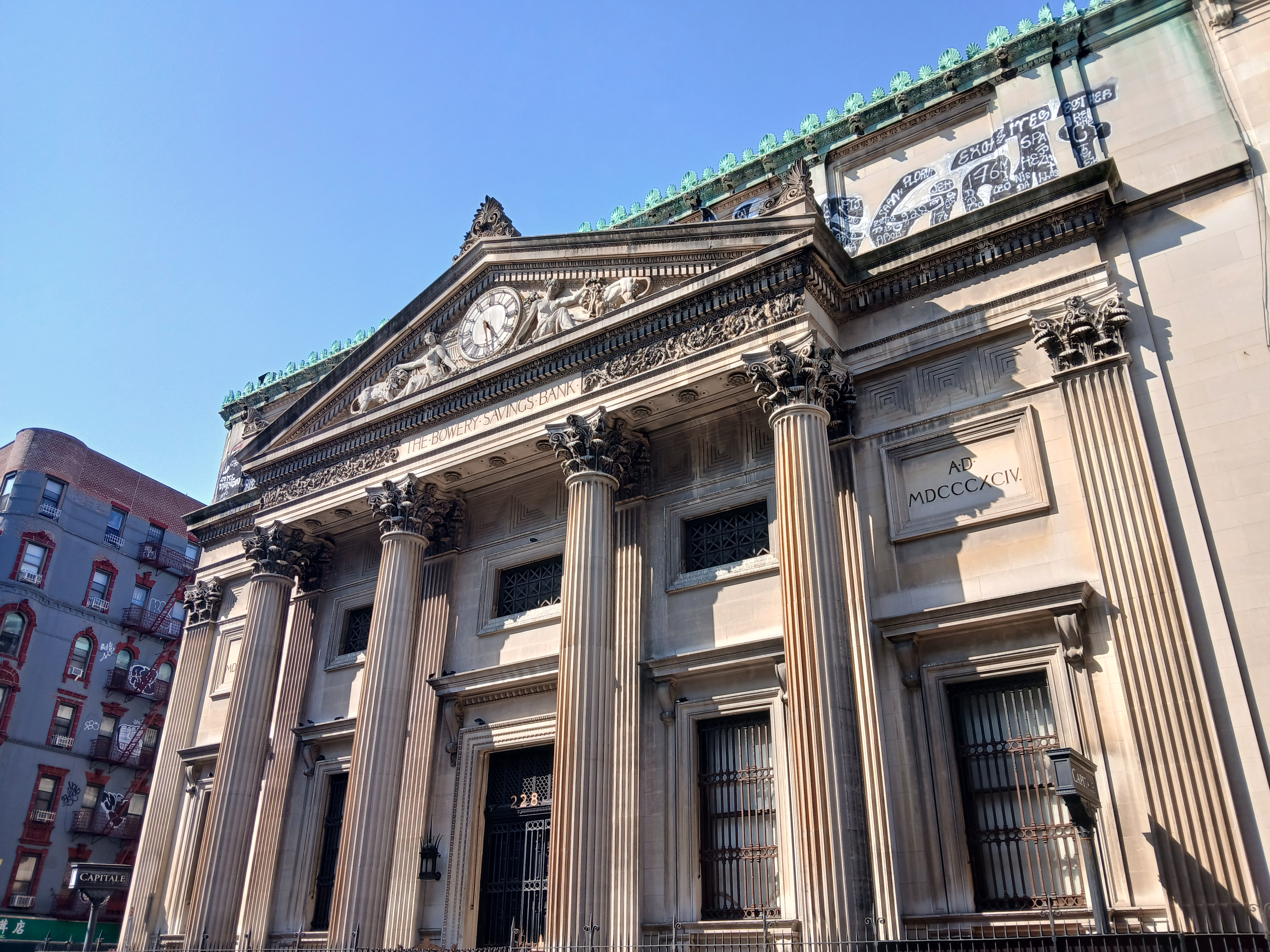
Colonnade and pediment on the Grand Street elevation of the facade

The Grand Street and Elizabeth Street elevations are connected, but the decorations on both elevations do not wrap around the corner. According to architectural critic Russell Sturgis, this was done not only to give the impression of an "applied facade" but also to hide the fact that the two streets met at an obtuse angle. Both elevations contain Corinthian pilasters, which divide either elevation into five bays. Except for the center bay on Grand Street, each bay contains a large aedicular window at ground level, above which is a plaque or a smaller window. The windows are covered by metal grilles, and a cornice runs above the attic on both elevations.

The center bay on Grand Street contains a secondary doorway, which has iron lamps and bronze signs. Above the secondary entrance on Grand Street is a slightly projecting portico, which is similar in design to the pediment over the Bowery entrance. The portico is supported by four columns, which are directly in front of the pilasters on the Grand Street elevation. MacMonnies designed a similar pedimental sculpture for the Grand Street portico. The pediment on Grand Street contains two female figures with lions, in contrast to the Bowery pediment. One of the women is depicted placing a laurel of garlands over her lion's head, while the other woman is depicted placing ribbons on her lion.

=== Interior ===
The interior was intended to give the impression of a Roman temple. The L-shaped space consists of a waiting room to the east and a banking room to the west. The banking room features a double-height coffered ceiling with a square skylight, supported by double-height Corinthian columns. Marble is used extensively in the teller's counters, walls, and mosaic floors. In addition, White employed stairs and skylights made of cast iron. The skylights allowed natural light into the building, while cast-iron registers and radiators, integrated with the rest of the bank's design, respectively provided hot air and hot water. The basement contained a restaurant, an electric plant, and boilers, in addition to heavyweight safes.

After the building was converted into an event venue in 2002, a VIP seating area with a fireplace was placed one story above the main banking room. In addition, several spaces next to the banking room, including the former vault, were converted into private party rooms.

==== Waiting room ====
Because the Bowery Savings Bank was mostly intended for working-class clients, White designed a waiting room on the narrower eastern section of the plot. The rectangular space measures 45 by 83 feet (14 by 25 m) and contains two colonnades of six columns each, which divide the northern and southern sides of the room into five bays. The colonnades separated the main section of the room from "aisles" to the north and south. Because the layout resembled that of a basilica, the space was nicknamed "the Chapel". The waiting room was used mainly by customers who were withdrawing money, since the process for withdrawals was extremely laborious. Above the waiting room was a directors' room.

The waiting room's floor is made of mosaic tiles. The floor largely consists of gray and white tesserae, although there are marble floor slabs between the columns on the north and south walls. The floor is surrounded by red, orange, yellow, and black tesserae, which are arranged in classical-style check, meander, and wave patterns. Two revolving doors lead from the Bowery entrance on the east; originally, men used the northern door and women used the southern door. Both sets of revolving doors are made of sheet metal and are flanked by Corinthian pilasters with brass capitals. A railing formerly divided the room into a northern section for men and a southern section for women.

The columns on the north and south walls rest on white-marble pedestals and are made of black-veined marble, which has been repainted. The columns contain Ionic capitals. In the center three bays on the north and south walls, there were seating areas with railings. The walls are wainscoted in marble, above which are panels decorated with fretwork and floral motifs. The southern wall contains an elevator, which was installed after the building's completion but harmonizes with the original design. The ceiling is divided into panels and is also decorated with fretwork and floral motifs. The central bay includes cast-iron ceiling grilles, which originally concealed a skylight that abutted the second-story committee and trustees' rooms. Each of the grilles is made of cast iron and consists of a meander-patterned border, a central rosette, and a glazed panel that conceals a cast-iron grid. Hanging from the center of the ceiling, in each bay, are cylindrical brass fixtures with indirect lighting; these fixtures were designed in 1980 by the Rambusch Decorating Company.

==== Banking room ====
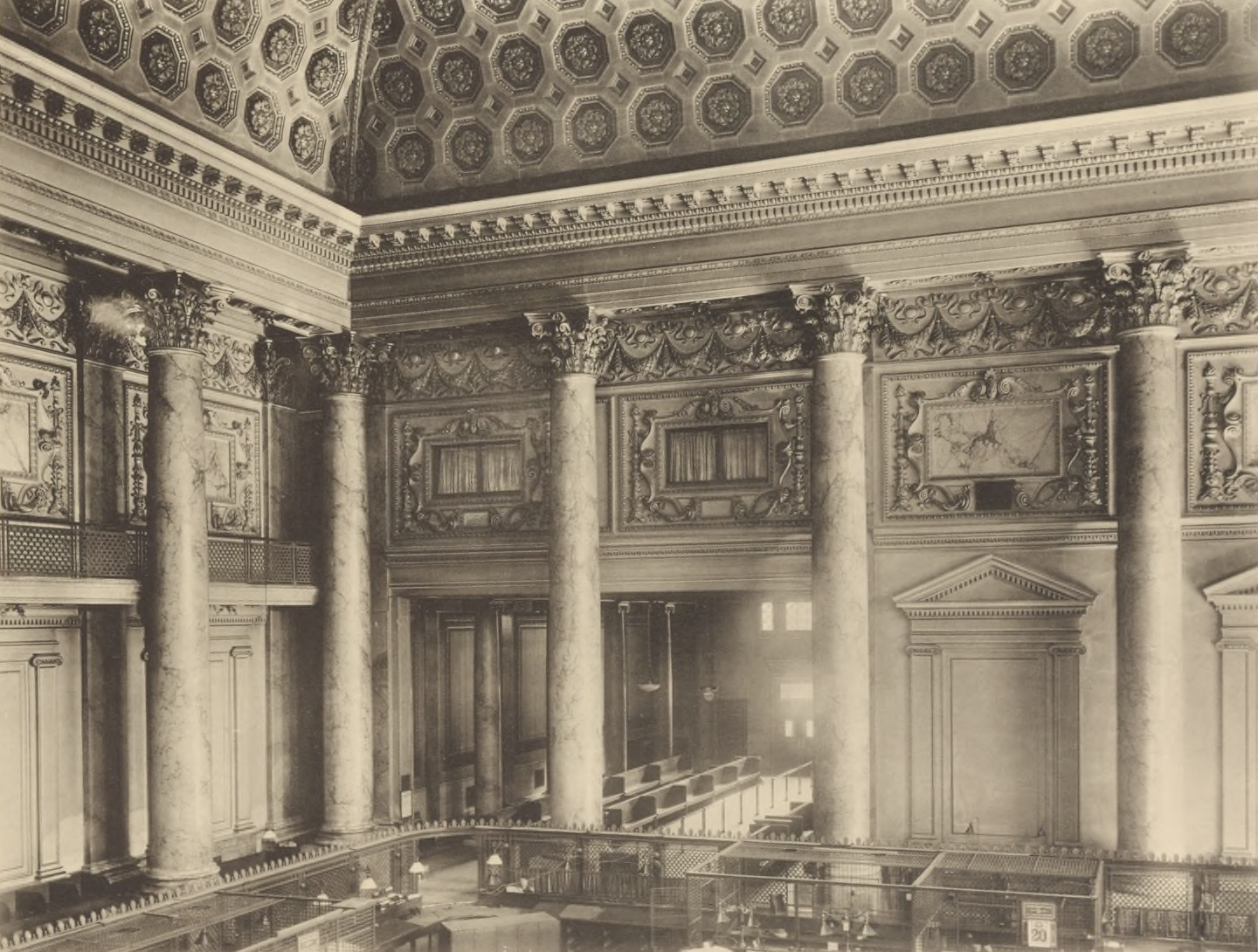
Banking room, facing east toward the Bowery entrance

The banking room was designed to maximize space usage on the irregular lot. The central portion of the banking room surrounded by two-story-tall Corinthian columns. The columns are arranged in a square layout of five by five bays. Although the bays are of equal width on the west and east walls, the center bay on the north and south walls is slightly wider than the other bays. The south wall is parallel to Grand Street, but, because of the 98-degree angle between Grand and Elizabeth Streets, there is a triangular aisle on the west wall next to Elizabeth Street. As planned, the columns were to be made of "Mycenean marble". The columns are similar in design to those in the waiting room, but the pedestals are made of Siena marble. Each of the columns is aligned with a double-height Corinthian pilaster on the room's outer walls.

The banking room's mosaic-tile floors are similar in design to those in the waiting room. Between the double-height columns are rectangular floor panels with red, yellow, and black tesserae arranged in an ornate pattern. The walls are largely made of gypsum plaster, although the lower section of the wall includes a Siena-marble dado. There are mahogany doors on the eastern wall, which lead to other rooms. At ground level, the western and southern walls contain aedicular windows, each of which is flanked by Ionic pilasters and is topped by an architrave and a triangular pediment. Above are molded grotesque-like frames, which surround windows or marble panels. The northern and eastern walls contain aedicular blind openings on ground level and marble panels above. The northern two bays of the eastern wall originally contained windows, which have since been covered. Above the upper windows and panels is an architrave decorated with swags in high relief.

The banking room's northern aisle contains a travertine stairway to the basement. Directly above is a cast-iron staircase to the second floor, held up by three stylized Corinthian columns. The second-floor stairway contains an ornate steel-and-brass balustrade decorated with semicircle motifs, as well as marble treads. The second-floor staircase leads to a cast-iron balcony with a wooden floor. On the south wall is the entrance vestibule from Grand Street, which contains a white marble floor and gray-marble walls. The Grand Street entrance is flanked by Ionic pilasters, which support a small porch.

The middle of the banking room had a Siena-marble teller's desk measuring 8 feet (2.4 m) high. It was shaped like a "U", with a men's counter to the north, a women's counter to the south, and a cashiers' window to the east. Behind the tellers' desk was a raised platform with a steel bank vault and the president's and secretary's rooms. The eastern face of the bank vault contains sunken panels above a meander motif, and the vault contains doors to its north and south. A clock, preserved from the previous building on the same site, is installed atop the bank vault. The president's and secretary's rooms were separated from the main banking room by glazed partitions made of mahogany, although most of the partitions have since been removed. Mahogany panels also surround a cloakroom to the west of the vault, as well as a restroom in the west aisle.

The center of the ceiling contains a pyramidal skeletal-steel skylight measuring 50 by 50 feet (15 m × 15 m) across. This skylight rises 60 feet (18 m) above the banking floor. The skylight contains two layers of glass; the outer layer contains a heavy grid of ribs and is covered with opaque panels. When the building was constructed, the Bowery Savings Bank's directors had suggested including a dome atop the banking hall, but such a dome would have been very dimly lit, so the skylight was installed instead. The skylight is surrounded by a coved ceiling with deep coffers, similar to those in the Basilica of Constantine in Rome. The room is illuminated by uplights on the coved ceiling, as well as on the capitals of the pilasters on the outer walls. The Grand Street entrance contains a rectangular ceiling with three rectangular panels, each containing a rosette with an acanthus motif. The remainder of the ceiling is generally made of gypsum plaster. The ceiling originally contained spiked lanterns, most of which have been removed.

== History ==
=== Original structures ===
The Bowery Savings Bank opened on June 2, 1834, in a three-story house at 128 Bowery, receiving $2,020 from fifty customers on its first day. The site had been occupied by the Butchers' and Drovers' Bank; at first, the two banks shared the building, operating at different times of day. By 1836, the Butchers' and Drovers' Bank relocated next door to 124 Bowery. The Bowery bank had $3 million in deposits by 1850, when the bank hired its first paid employees. By then, increasing business prompted the Bowery Savings Bank to purchase an adjacent lot on 130 Bowery in January 1852. The Bowery bank's trustees hired the firm of Thomas & Son to design an Italianate structure at 128 and 130 Bowery, the bank's second building on the site. Work on the edifice commenced in May 1852, and it opened in March 1853. The second building included a U-shaped tellers' counter, a ceiling skylight, and basement vaults.

The bank bought further land lots in 1856, 1864, and 1865. The Bowery Savings Bank's deposits continued to grow in the late 19th century, from $6.5 million in 1863 to about $83 million by 1903. Technological advances during this time prompted the bank to upgrade its headquarters. The first expansion, in 1856, was built with an iron frame, which the bank officials believed would be resistant to burglaries and conflagrations. A ventilation system was installed in 1865, and the banking hall's ceiling was raised in the late 1870s. In addition, the bank implemented a new bookkeeping system in 1879, grouping depositors' ledgers into sections overseen by different bookkeepers.

By the 1870s, there were many savings banks on the surrounding segment of Bowery. Many of lower Manhattan's savings banks were moving uptown during that time, as many of their depositors had started relocating northward. Contravening this trend, the Bowery Savings Bank's officials said in 1876 that it would continue to serve the surrounding community, and bank officials began planning to expand the existing building instead. By 1884, the bank had an L-shaped frontage on Grand and Elizabeth Streets and on Bowery. The bank's second building was overcrowded by the early 1890s.

=== Replacement ===
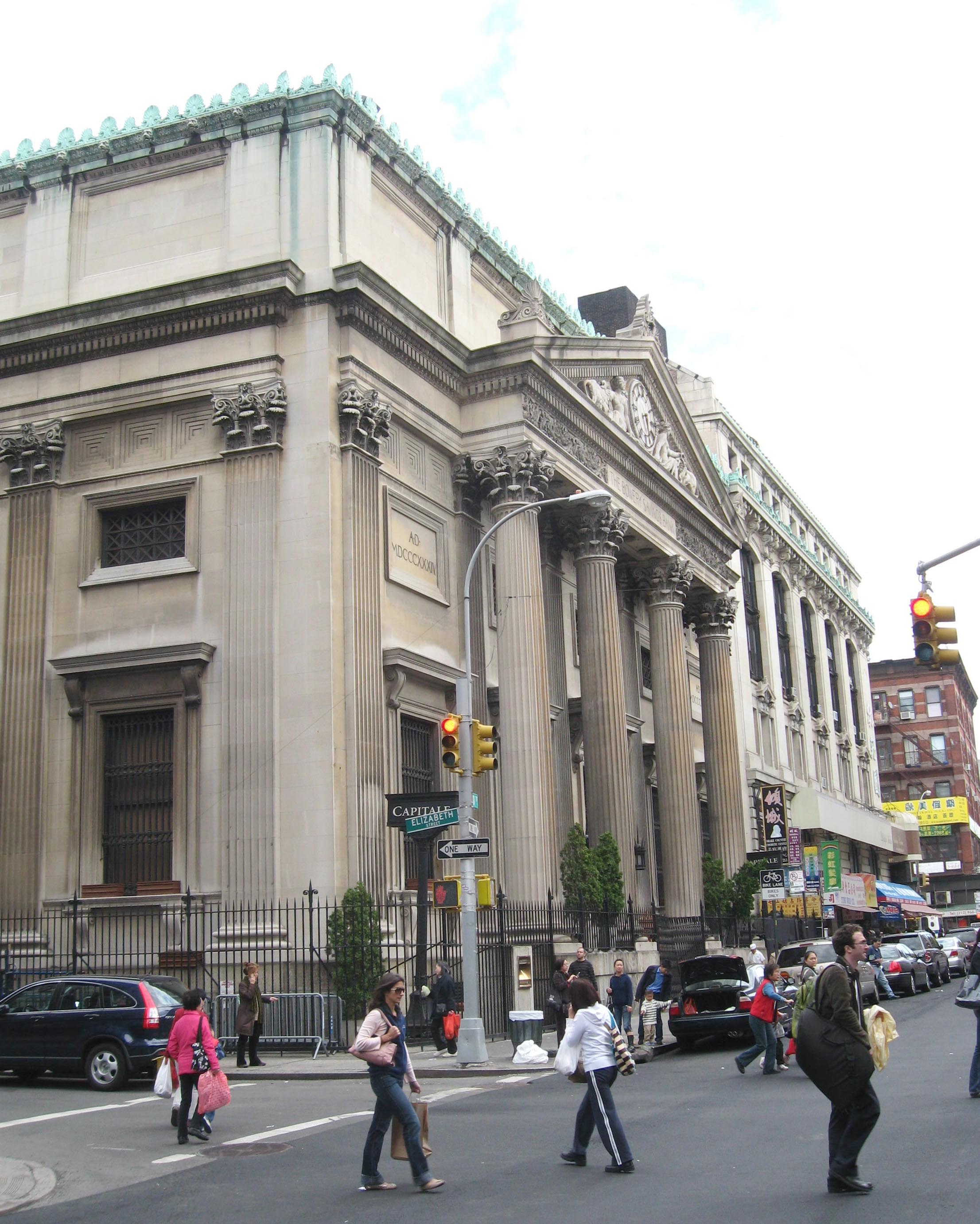
The Grand Street elevation of the Bowery Savings Bank Building as seen from just west of Elizabeth Street

In November 1891, the Bowery Savings Bank's trustees paid $155,500 for three 25-by-100-foot (7.6 by 30.5 m) land lots at 222 to 226 Grand Street. Shortly after, the trustees announced that they would build a new bank structure on Grand Street; the bank's charter required that the new building include an entrance from Bowery. The trustees invited Charles W. Clinton, Cyrus L. W. Eidlitz, George B. Post, Napoleon LeBrun, and McKim, Mead & White to participate in an architectural design competition for the site. The bank also organized a subcommittee, which went to six savings bank buildings in Manhattan and Brooklyn to gain inspiration for the new building's design. The subcommittee then outlined their requirements for the competition, which called for a banking room to the west and a waiting room to the east. The five participating architects submitted their design proposals to the bank in September 1892. Architectural professor William Robert Ware reviewed all of the entries and recommended that the bank use McKim, Mead & White's design; the details of the other four proposals are unknown.

Work on the western part of the site began in May 1893, following the expiration of existing leases. The bank's existing building initially continued to operate as normal during this time, although a gallery was added within the old building. A temporary partition separated the new banking hall from the older structure on Bowery. The houses on the western part of the site, along Grand and Elizabeth Streets, had been demolished by July 1893, and excavations for the foundation and cellar had commenced. The New York Times estimated that the new building would cost $500,000. The Bowery Savings Bank rented safe-deposit boxes while the new banking room was being constructed. In addition, the bank's directors met in the Butchers' and Drovers' Bank at 124 Bowery during the new building's construction.

The new banking room on Grand and Elizabeth Streets was in operation by June 1894. At this point, the bank had just over 100,000 depositors. According to a book about the Bowery Savings Bank, "Particular pride was taken in the enormous vaults, which were constructed with protective ingenuity beyond that applied to any similar storage facilities in the world." The older building was then demolished, and the waiting room and directors' room were constructed on the eastern part of the site. The eastern section of the building opened in January 1895. The waiting room's decorations were still being completed at the end of that year, at which point the bank had spent $570,000 on the new building.

=== Use as bank ===
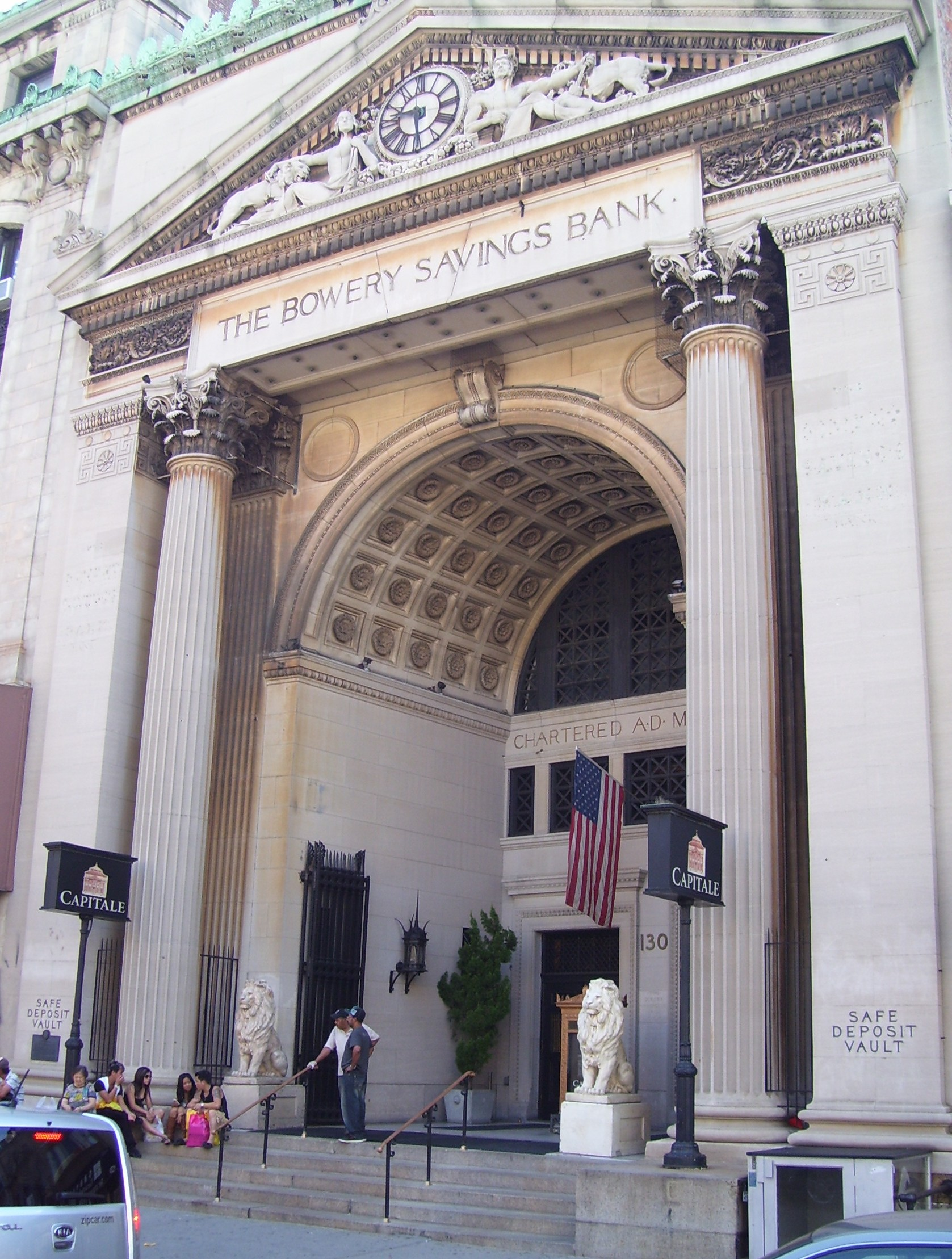
Main Bowery entrance, seen from the north

In the 25 years after the new bank building opened, the Bowery Savings Bank continued to expand due to the rapid population growth of the Lower East Side. Although the bank had 140,000 accounts by 1904, it had only four tellers, two draft clerks, and an information clerk. (Note: The four tellers included one for payments, two for receipts, and one for new accounts. Men and women were served by a different receiving teller and a different draft clerk.) Customers could create a new account or deposit money relatively easily, since male and female customers used the same window for either task. On the other hand, the process of withdrawing money was much more complex, and customers frequently had to wait in the "Chapel" for two or three hours. In addition, each savings bank in New York was mostly limited to one location until 1923, when the state legislature passed a law allowing savings banks to construct branches. By World War I, many of the area's residents had relocated northward, leaving the bank "too far downtown to continue the fullest exercise of its functions", but the bank was still unable to relocate from the Bowery neighborhood or open a branch.

The Bowery Savings Bank had wanted to open a branch in Midtown Manhattan since the early 20th century. The bank decided to construct a new structure at 110 East 42nd Street in 1920, and construction of the new branch began in 1921. Taking advantage of an exemption in New York state law, the bank acquired the Universal Savings Bank in lower Manhattan, which then relocated to 42nd Street. By the time the 42nd Street branch opened in 1923, there were 155,000 people with accounts at the Bowery Savings Bank, of which 5,600 were at the 42nd Street branch. In June 1923, the bank moved $202 million of deposits (equal to $3.0 billion in 2025 (Note: Johnston, Louis; Williamson, Samuel H. (2023). "What Was the U.S. GDP Then?". MeasuringWorth. United States Gross Domestic Product deflator figures follow the MeasuringWorth series.)) from the original branch to the new branch, using 14 armored cars guarded by 100 heavily armed policemen. The bank retained its original offices on Bowery. Even though lower Manhattan was losing population, the "Old Bowery" continued to grow, and the older branch's deposits increased from $100 million in 1910 to $250 million in 1930.

The Bowery Savings Bank installed safe-deposit boxes in its Bowery branch in April 1930. The bank had introduced safe-deposit boxes at its 42nd Street branch the previous year, and the boxes were highly popular with that branch's customers. A new chromium-steel vault, with a 17-short-ton (15-long-ton; 15 t) door and space for 10,000 safe-deposit boxes, was constructed at the Bowery branch. The addition also included coupon and conference rooms. By the bank's centenary in 1934, the surrounding neighborhood had devolved into a "dingy resort of the city's poorest derelicts", although the bank still held tens of millions of dollars in deposits. The bank started selling life insurance in 1942. To attract customers, the Bowery Savings Bank placed weighing scales in the building for its patrons. The building also hosted events in the mid-20th century, including meetings of the East Side Chamber of Commerce, training programs for schoolchildren, and art exhibitions.

As the Bowery Savings Bank continued to grow, the 130 Bowery building remained the bank's main branch. By 1972, the bank had over $3 billion in deposits at ten branches. Although the surrounding neighborhood had been part of Little Italy during the mid-20th century, the area's Chinese population was expanding by the 1970s. During this time, bank officials said they were "very pleased" with the Bowery branch, due to the growth in the number of Chinese depositors. The Bowery Savings Bank was acquired by H. F. Ahmanson & Co. in 1987, two years after it nearly went bankrupt. Greenpoint Bank took over the banking spaces in 1995 after having bought many of Ahmanson's branches. The building continued to host events such as an exhibit of historic photographs. At some point before 2004, records from the building were moved to Lake Success, New York; these records were relocated to a bank in Brooklyn in 2004.

=== Use as event venue ===
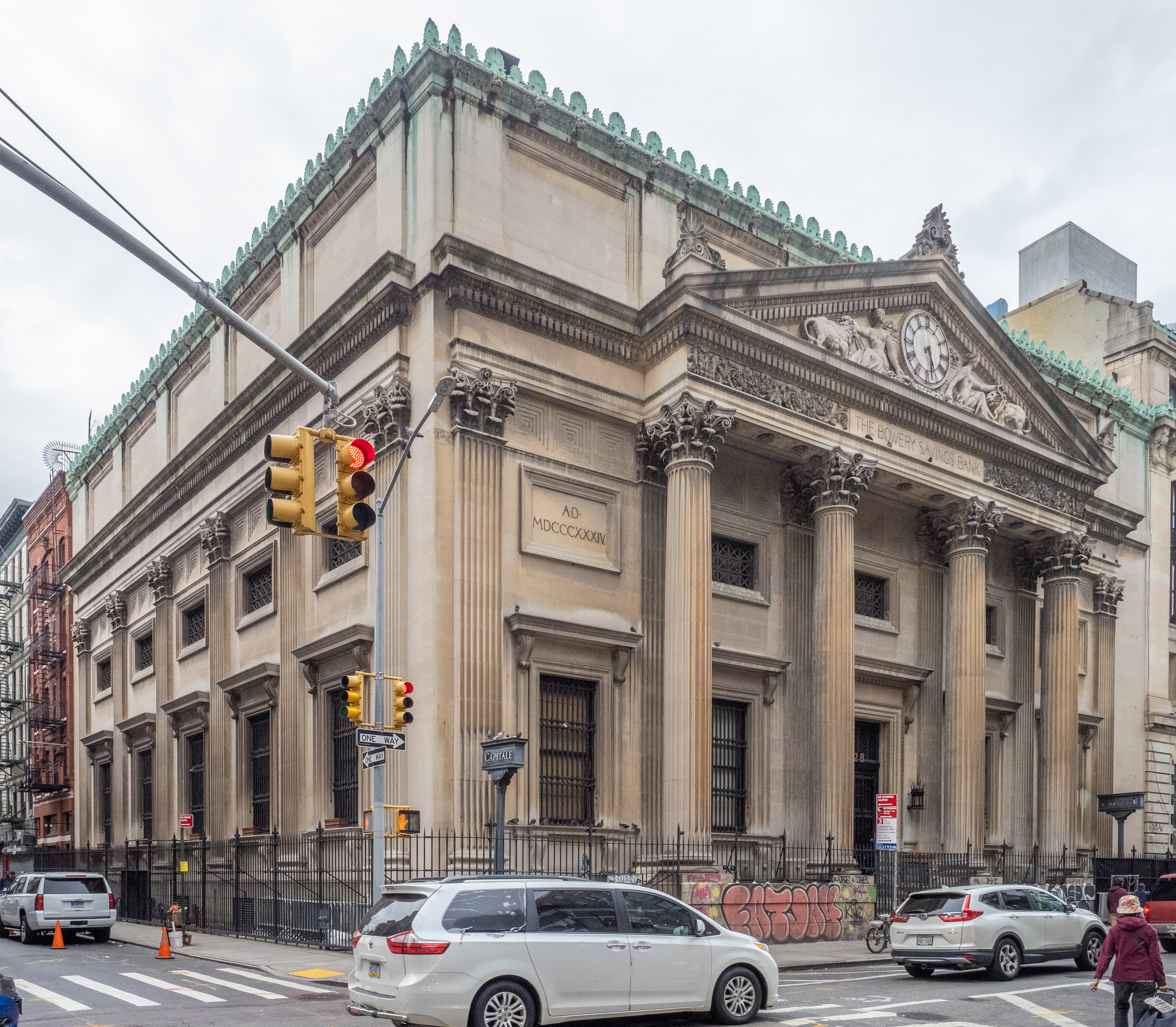
The facade as seen from the corner of Grand and Elizabeth Streets

In 2000, Greenpoint Bank sold the Bowery Savings Bank Building to food importer and developer Jeffrey Wu. The former bank's records were relocated to Lake Success, New York. Subsequently, Wu hired architect Anthony J. Moralishvili to design plans for converting the building into a catering hall. Wu also negotiated with potential catering-hall operators, including Cipriani S.A. Nightclub manager Margaret Millard announced in January 2002 that she wanted to turn the building into an event venue called Capitale, named as an allusion to the bank's history. Millard had not yet formally leased the building from Wu, who supported the plans and had spent the previous year renovating the structure. Millard also wanted to obtain a cabaret license, which would allow customers to dance at private events in the building, but residents of Chinatown and Little Italy expressed concern that the building would function as a nightclub. Manhattan Community Board 2 asked the New York State Liquor Authority to deny the venue a liquor license, but the authority granted the license anyway. Seth Greenberg, who later became Capitale's general manager, leased the building and renovated it into an event space. The project cost $4 million or $5 million; the interior of the building remained relatively intact during this time.

Prior to the venue's opening, Greenberg said of the building's location on Bowery: "I think that the fact that we're here will make us sort of an anchor for other places to follow". Capitale opened in late 2002 and quickly became popular among celebrities. Among the venue's early guests were Donald Trump, Justin Timberlake, David Blaine, and Dan Aykroyd. Capitale's business mainly consisted of private events, such as weddings and bar mitzvahs. The building also hosted events by performers Alicia Keys, Chris Rock, and Kanye West and the band Maroon 5. In addition, the building was used as a filming location for the TV series Gossip Girl, Gotham, and Law & Order: Special Victims Unit. A lis pendens was filed against the building in 2011 because the owners had failed to repay a $3.5 million loan on the building. Michael and David Marvisi bought the building for $33 million in 2017. Paramount Realty and Atelier WM placed 130 Bowery for sale in early 2019. Paramount and Atelier considered marketing the building for sale without any tenants, but a spokesperson for Capitale contested this move, saying their lease did not expire until 2032. The sellers did not specify an asking price, but the building was expected to be sold for more than $50 million; however, the auction never occurred.

The Capitale event space inside the building closed indefinitely during the COVID-19 pandemic in New York City. The building's owners sought to sell it for $35 million in March 2022, and they filed for Chapter 11 bankruptcy protection in September 2022 after defaulting on their $12 million loan. The Marvisis requested permission to sell the building to SC Holdings in July 2023, and SC Holdings agreed to buy the building that September for $25.7 million. This sale failed to materialize due to an issue with a gas line. An auction for the building was scheduled in January 2025, at which point Capitale was no longer operating the event venue. Catering magnate Ilya Zavolunov bought the Bowery Savings Bank Building that July for $20 million.

== Impact ==
White's choice of a Roman classical style set a trend for bank buildings, first in New York, then across the United States. The structure was one of the first bank buildings in the nation with natural ventilation and marble surfaces that could be cleaned easily. Henry Hope Reed Jr. wrote of the building in 1984: "It was claimed, on the basis of the monumental portico and lofty interior banking hall, that this was the first truly splendid bank building in New York City." Christopher Gray of The New York Times wrote in 2010: "The bank as a work of architecture went from the merely big to the colossal with the Bowery Savings Bank of 1895." New York University architecture professor Lance Jay Brown said the building "still stands as a marker of a pivotal moment in the history of American architecture".

The building's design also had a positive impact on the surrounding neighborhood. Sandee Brawarsky of The New York Times said in 2000 that the Bowery Savings Bank Building was "a monumental temple of a bank near Grand Street that gives the Bowery a bit of grandeur". Fred Ferretti of the Times described the building as "a sort of fortress on the Bowery", denoting the eastern end of Manhattan's Little Italy neighborhood. Other authors wrote that the structure also served as the "architectural anchor" of Bowery in the 20th century, when the corridor was a skid row.

Critics praised the building's details as well. Mimi Sheraton of the Times said: "One can only imagine the awe with which these refugees from the slums of Naples and Canton and the shtetls of Poland and Russia entered this magnificent cathedral of a bank with its marble, brass and mosaics, to deposit small savings proudly." After the building was converted into Capitale, John Mariani of Esquire magazine wrote: "With its sixty-foot ceilings, humbling Corinthian columns, and Tiffany-style skylight, the building lives up to its landmark status." Nick Paumgarten of The New Yorker characterized the interior in 2003 as having "nearly an acre of marble", with potted palm trees, while Time Out magazine called the banking room the "most jaw-dropping venue for a meal" in New York City.

The New York City Landmarks Preservation Commission (LPC) designated the exterior of the 130 Bowery branch as a city landmark in 1966. The building was added to the National Register of Historic Places (NRHP) in 1980. The LPC hosted public hearings in June 1993 to determine whether to designate the Bowery Savings Bank Building's interior as a city landmark, along with those of four banks in Brooklyn and another bank in Manhattan. (Note: The others were the Dime Savings Bank Building, Williamsburgh Savings Bank Tower, Williamsburgh Savings Bank Building (175 Broadway), Brooklyn Trust Company Building, and Bowery Savings Bank Building (110 East 42nd Street).) The original banking room's interior was designated a New York City landmark on August 23, 1994. The building was added in 2013 to the Bowery Historic District, an NRHP district, after local residents had advocated for the historic district's creation for more than a year.

== See also ==
- List of New York City Designated Landmarks in Manhattan below 14th Street
- National Register of Historic Places listings in Manhattan below 14th Street
