= Bowery Savings Bank =

New York City bank chartered in 1834

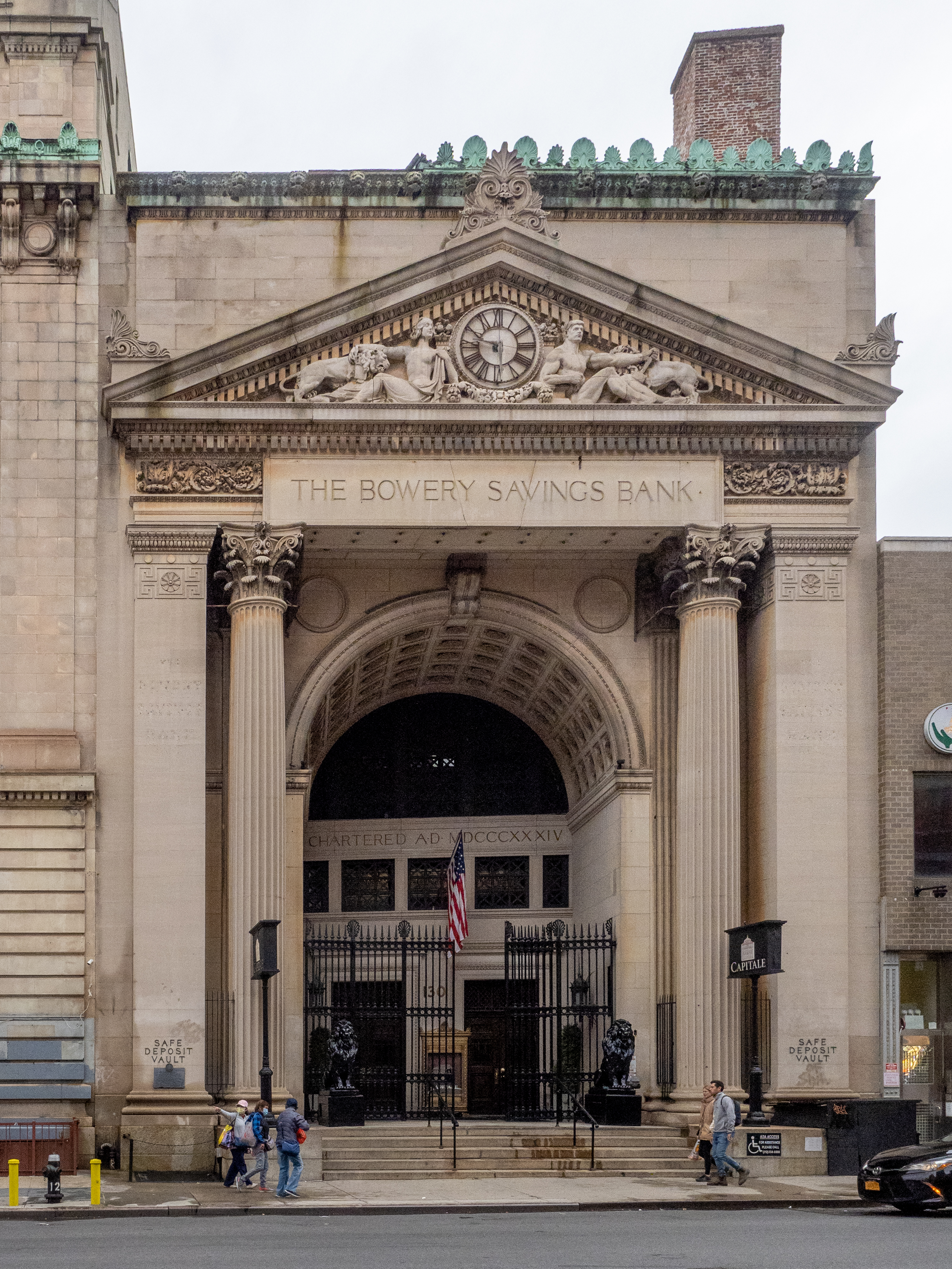
The original headquarters at 130 Bowery, Manhattan

The Bowery Savings Bank was a bank in New York City, chartered in May 1834. In 1930, it was the largest bank in the United States based on total deposits. By 1980, it had over 35 branches in the New York metropolitan area. In 1992, it was sold to H. F. Ahmanson & Co. for $200 million.

The bank's first branch at 130 Bowery was replaced twice; the current building on the site, designed by Stanford White and completed in 1895, is now an upscale venue. The bank decided to move its headquarters in 1920, and a new building was constructed from 1921 to 1923 at 110 East 42nd Street in Midtown Manhattan. Both of these buildings are New York City designated landmarks.

== History ==
The Bowery Savings Bank opened in 1834 at the site of what is now 128-130 Bowery in Manhattan. From 1930 to 1976, Bowery Savings was the largest savings bank in the USA, based on total deposits. By 1980, it had over 35 branches located in the boroughs of Manhattan, Brooklyn, and Queens, as well as Nassau and Suffolk counties on Long Island. When bank deregulation was enacted, the bank began to suffer losses as a result of rising savings account interest rates. By 1982, the bank was running out of cash; in 1985, the Federal Deposit Insurance Corporation (FDIC) arranged for the bank to be sold to Richard Ravitch and others. It was sold for $100 million and allowed to maintain a capital deficit of $220 million rather than pay out on the $5 billion in deposits. In 1992, it was sold to H. F. Ahmanson & Co. for $200 million. The name was changed by 1992 to Home Savings of America. In 1995, Ahmanson sold their New York operations to Greenpoint Savings Bank. By 2004, Greenpoint had been sold to North Fork Bank, and in 2007, North Fork was sold to Capital One Bank.

From 1972 to 1992, baseball Hall-of-Famer Joe DiMaggio was spokesman for the Bowery Savings Bank.

=== Timeline ===
- May 1, 1834 – New York State chartered the Bowery Savings Bank (May 1834–Oct 1985)
- October 22, 1920 – Universal Savings Bank acquired by merger
- February 14, 1949 – North River Savings Bank acquired by merger
- February 11, 1980 – Equitable Savings & Loan Association acquired by merger
- October 1, 1985 – Merge with The State Bowery Savings Bank
- April 20, 1992 – Name changed to Home Savings of America, Bowery Division, a state savings bank
- September 1, 1992 – Converted to Federal Home Savings of America, Bowery Division, a Federal savings bank

== Buildings ==
=== 130 Bowery ===
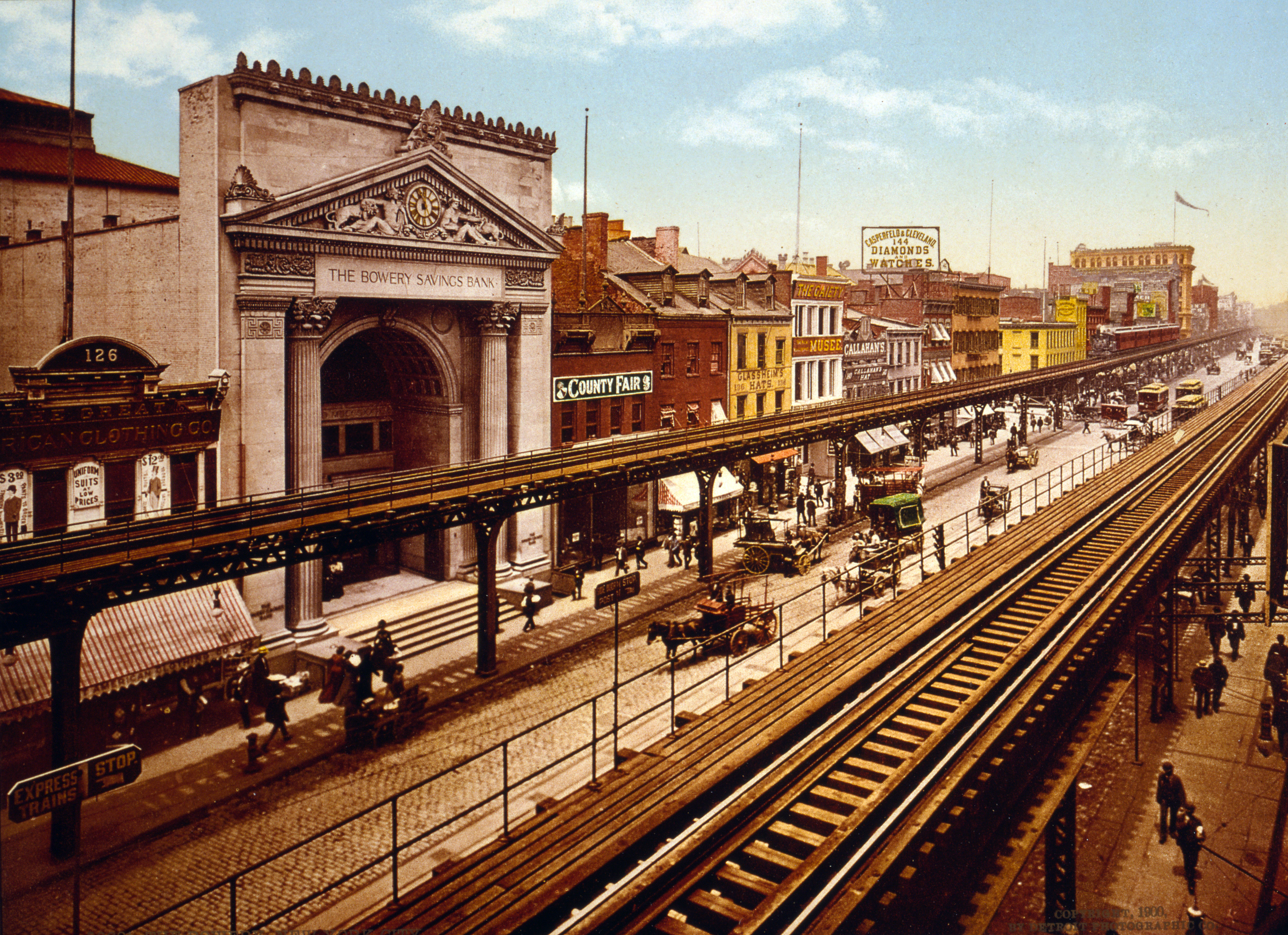
Bowery Savings Bank headquarters at 128–130 Bowery, circa 1900

The bank's headquarters at 128–130 Bowery between Broome and Grand Streets was designed by Stanford White of the architecture firm of McKim, Mead & White, and built in 1893–95. The L-shaped building continues from Bowery through to Elizabeth Street, and has a second entrance facade at 228 Grand Street. White's choice of a Roman classical style for the building, a first, set a trend for bank buildings, first in New York, and then across the United States. The exterior features Corinthian columns and sculpted pediments by Frederic MacMonnies, while the interior gives the impression of a Roman temple, and is said to be one of the great spaces in New York. It features the extensive use of marble, in the teller's counters — which are made of yellow Siena marble — the walls, and the mosaic floors. In addition, White employed faux marble scagliola columns, coffered ceilings and stairs and skylights made of cast iron.

The exterior of the original building was designated by the New York City Landmarks Preservation Commission as an official city landmark in 1966, and the interior was given the same designation in 1994. It was added to the National Register of Historic Places in 1980. It is currently the Capitale, restaurant, night club and event space which is popular as a wedding site. In 2012, the connected building at 124 Bowery, designed by York & Sawyer and completed in 1902, was also designated a landmark.

=== 110 East 42nd Street ===
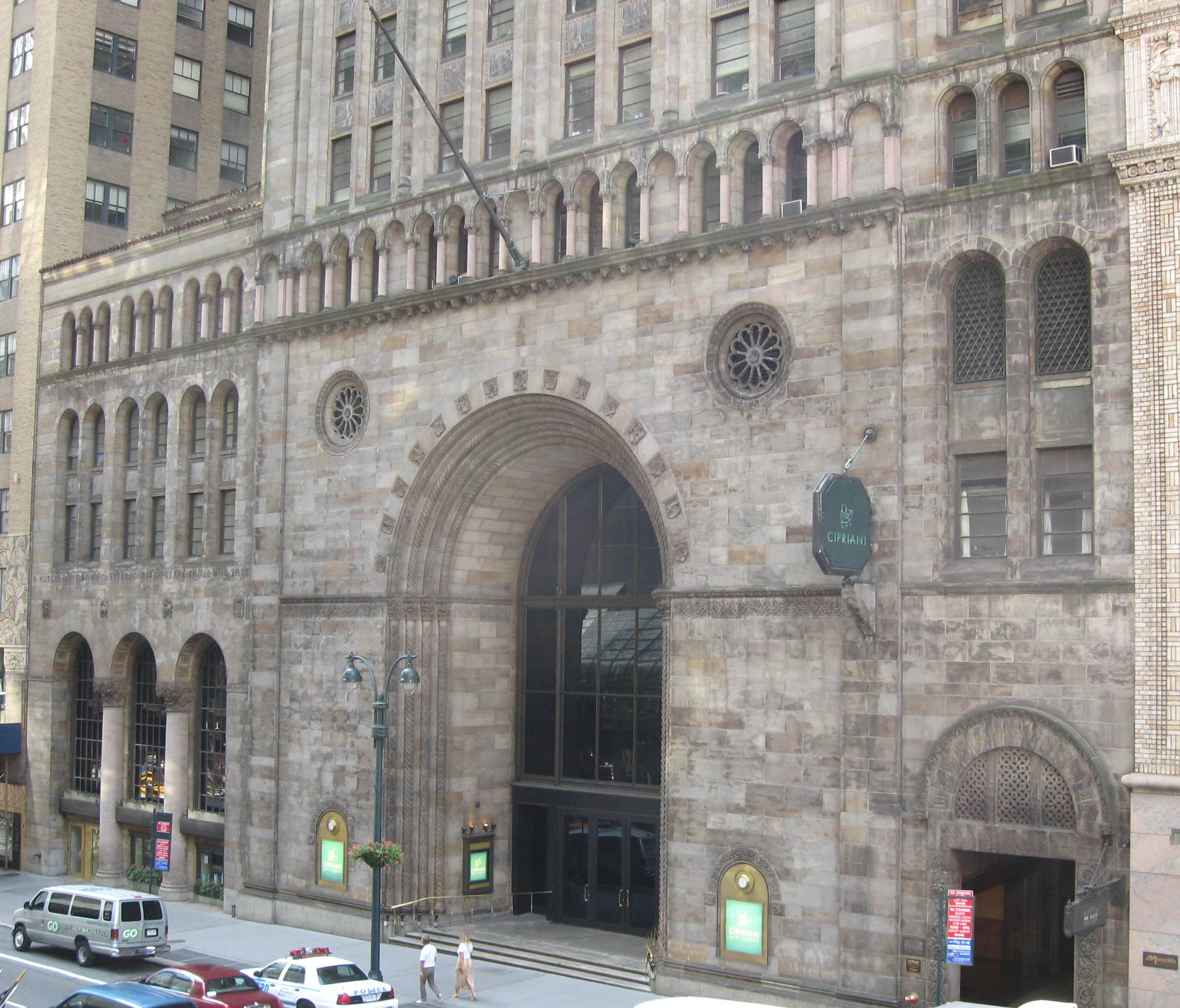
Former headquarters at 110 East 42nd Street, now a restaurant and event space

The bank decided to move its headquarters in 1920, and a new building was constructed from 1921 to 1923 at 110 East 42nd Street between Park and Lexington Avenues across from Grand Central Terminal in Midtown Manhattan. It was designed by York and Sawyer in Italian Romanesque Revival style, with William Louis Ayres as the partner in charge. The huge interior, which measures 65 feet high, 80 feet wide and 197 1/2 feet long, utilizes marble, limestone, sandstone and bronze screens to create a space reminiscent of a basilica. It has been called "one of the great spaces of New York." A six-story addition to the east, which came to be called "The Chapel", was built in 1931–33.

The building was designated a New York City landmark in 1996. The ground floor is now a Cipriani upscale event space.

== Archives ==
In April 2019, workers cleaning out a basement in Brooklyn discovered century-old records of the Bowery Savings Bank. Archivists moved rapidly to secure at least some of these records. While the historical value was not immediately known, a historian told The New York Times they could “be priceless”.

In the 1920s, Henry Miller wrote a short text about the architecture of this bank, in a short text he called mezzotint and whose title was A Bowery Phoenix.
