= Belleville, Meurthe-et-Moselle =

Belleville
- Commune
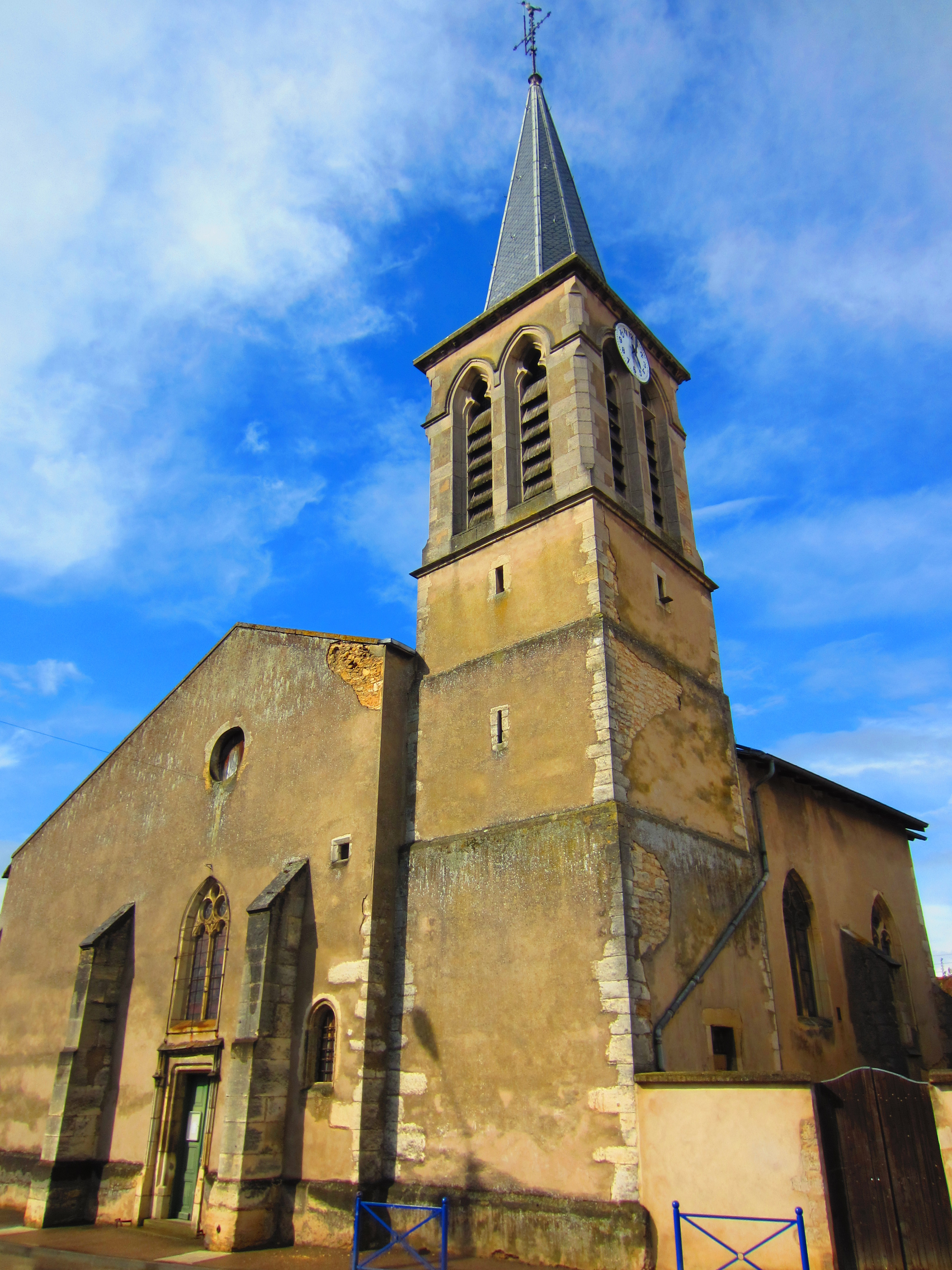
- The church in Belleville

- Coat of arms
- Location of Belleville
- Location within France Location within Grand Est
- Coordinates: 48°49′09″N 6°05′55″E
- Country: France
- Region: Grand Est
- Department: Meurthe-et-Moselle
- Arrondissement: Nancy
- Canton: Entre Seille et Meurthe
- Intercommunality: Bassin de Pont-à-Mousson

Government
  - Mayor (2020–2026): Dominique Rouby
- Area^{1}: 10.22 km^{2} (3.95 sq mi)
- Elevation: 190 m (620 ft)
- Highest elevation: 333 m (1,093 ft)
- Lowest elevation: 182 m (597 ft)
- Population (2023): 1,512
  - Density: 147.9/km^{2} (383.2/sq mi)
- Time zone: UTC+01:00 (CET)
  - Summer (DST): UTC+02:00 (CEST)
- INSEE/Postal code: 54060 /54940
- ^{1} French Land Register data, which excludes lakes, ponds, glaciers > 1 km^{2} (0.386 sq mi or 247 acres) and river estuaries.

Belleville (French pronunciation: [bɛlvil]) is a commune in the Meurthe-et-Moselle department in northeastern France. Belleville lies on the left bank of the river Moselle, about 10 km south of Pont-à-Mousson and 15 km north of Nancy. Its railway station (Belleville) is served by regional trains to Metz and Nancy. The A31 motorway Metz–Nancy passes through the commune. There is a primary school in Belleville.

== Population ==
Historical population
Year	Pop.	±% p.a.
1968	1,225	—
1975	1,176	−0.58%
1982	1,163	−0.16%
1990	1,276	+1.17%
1999	1,280	+0.03%
2007	1,487	+1.89%
2012	1,423	−0.88%
2017	1,441	+0.25%
2023	1,512	+0.80%
Source: INSEE

== See also ==
- Communes of the Meurthe-et-Moselle department
- Parc naturel régional de Lorraine
