= Manuel Gómez-Moreno =

- Manuel Gómez-Moreno may refer to:
  - Manuel Gómez-Moreno González (1834-1918), Spanish painter and archaeologist
  - Manuel Gómez-Moreno Martínez (1870-1970), his son, Spanish historian and archaeologist
