= Complutense University of Madrid =

Public university in Madrid, Spain

Coordinates: 40°26′57″N 3°43′41″W

- Universidad Complutense de Madrid (Spanish)
- Former names: Estudio de Escuelas Generales de Alcalá (1293–1499); Universitas Complutensis (1499–1836); Literary University (1836–1851); Universidad Central (1851–1943) Universidad de Madrid (1943–1970)
- Motto: Libertas Perfundet Omnia Luce (Latin)
- Motto in English: "Freedom will flood all things with light"
- Type: Public research non-profit coeducational higher education institution
- Established: 20 May 1293; 733 years ago
- Founder: Cardinal Francisco Jiménez de Cisneros
- Academic affiliations: Compostela Group of Universities; Europaeum; IAU; Una Europa; UNICA; Utrecht Network
- Budget: €607,559,030
- Rector: Joaquín Goyache Goñi
- Administrative staff: 11,162
- Undergraduates: 74,771
- Postgraduates: 11,388
- Location: Madrid, Spain
- Campus: Urban 2 campuses in Madrid; --Moncloa Campus --Somosaguas Campus
- Colours: Red
- Website: ucm.es

The Complutense University of Madrid (Spanish: Universidad Complutense de Madrid, UCM; Latin: Universitas Complutensis Matritensis) is a public research university located in Madrid. Founded in Alcalá in 1293 (before relocating to Madrid in 1836), it is one of the oldest operating universities in the world. It is located on a sprawling campus that occupies the entirety of the Ciudad Universitaria district of Madrid, with annexes in the district of Somosaguas in the neighboring city of Pozuelo de Alarcón. It is named after the ancient Roman settlement of Complutum, now an archeological site in Alcalá de Henares, just east of Madrid.

The Complutense is one of the most historically relevant universities in Spain and in the world, and arguably the most intimately entwined with the development of the Spanish state. Both the Palace of Moncloa (the prime minister's official residence) and the Spanish Constitutional Court are located directly on the university's campus grounds. The university has trained numerous Spanish prime ministers, EU commissioners, and NATO secretaries-general, as well as members of the Spanish Royal House over the centuries. By Royal Decree of 1857, the Central University was the first and only institution in Spain authorized to grant doctorate degrees throughout the Spanish Empire, which established it as the "Docta" (the Learned), making it the ultimate intellectual authority in Spain. This power was decentralized in the late 20th century, but the Complutense retained much of its historical precedence to the present day.

It enrolls over 86,000 students, making it the eighth largest non-distance European university by enrollment. In 1909, the Central University became one of the first universities in the world to grant a doctorate degree to a woman. It was renamed as Universidad de Madrid ('University of Madrid') in 1943.

== History ==
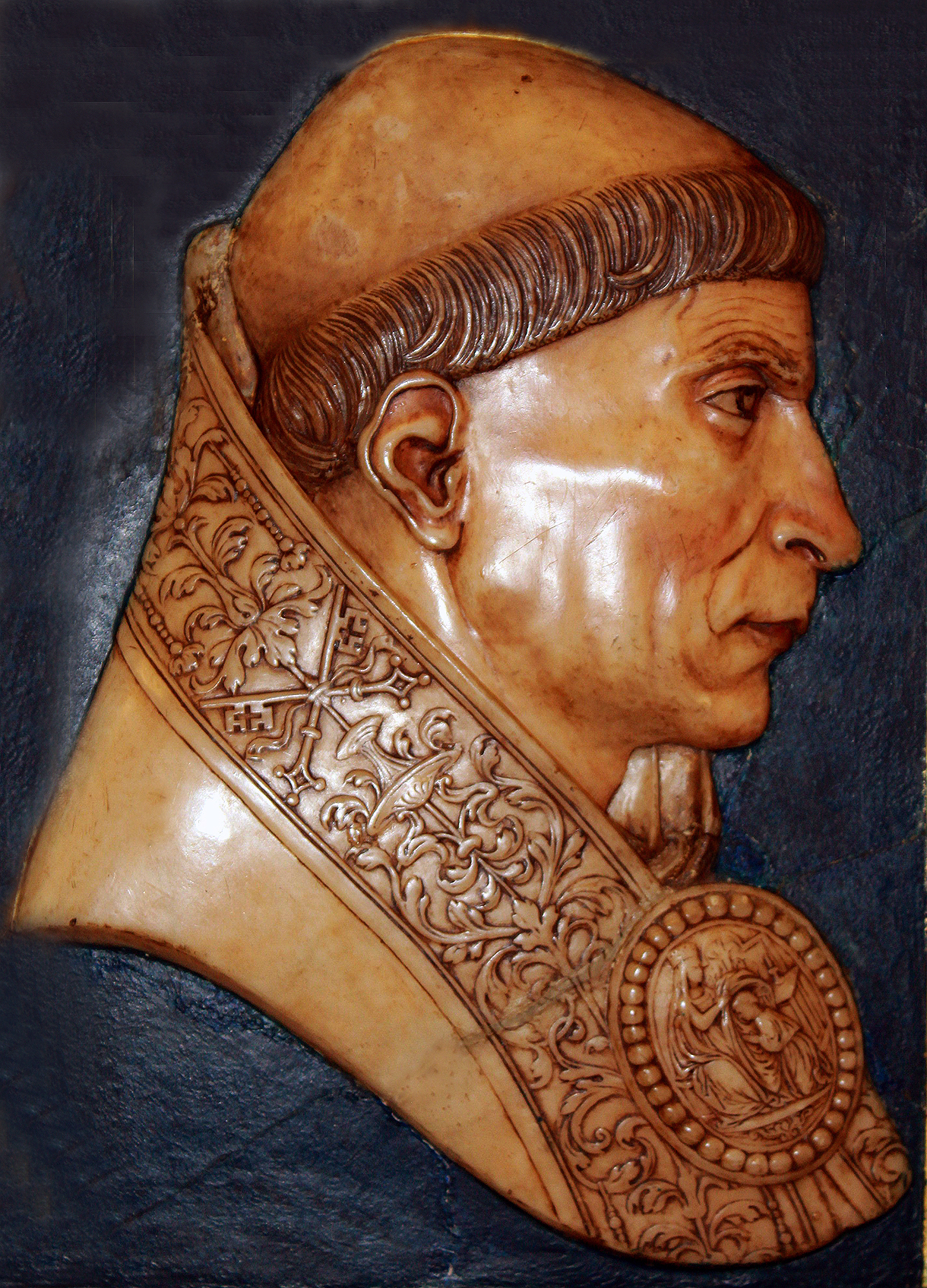
Cardinal Cisneros expanded the existing Studium Generale into a large five-college University.

On 20 May 1293, King Sancho IV of Castile granted the Archbishop of Toledo, Gonzalo Pérez Gudiel, a royal charter to found a studium generale (as universities were known at that time), named El Estudio de Escuelas Generales in Alcalá de Henares. One of its alumni, Cardinal Cisneros, made extensive purchases of land and ordered the construction of many buildings, in what became the first university campus ex-novo in history: The Civitas Dei, or city of God, named after the work of Augustine of Hippo. On 13 April 1499, Cardinal Cisneros secured from Pope Alexander VI a papal bull to expand Complutense into a full university. This papal bull conferred official recognition throughout Christendom to all degrees granted by the university. It also renamed the institution Universitas Complutensis, after Complutum, which was the Latin name of Alcalá de Henares, where the university was originally located.

In the 1509–1510 school year, the Complutense University already operated with five major schools: Arts and Philosophy, Theology, Canon Law, Philology and Medicine. During the 16th and 17th centuries, Complutense University became one of the greatest centers of academic excellence in the world. Many of the leading figures in science, arts and politics of that age studied or taught in Complutense's classrooms. Special colleges were created for students of foreign origin, such as Flemish or Irish (at the Irish College of San Jorge at Alcalá de Henares).

In 1785, Complutense became one of the first universities in the world to grant a doctorate to a female student, María Isidra de Guzmán y de la Cerda. In comparison, University of Oxford did not accept female scholars until 1920, and the University of Cambridge did not grant a PhD to a female student until 1926.

In 1824, Francisco Tadeo Calomarde further expanded Complutense by merging it with the University of Sigüenza. By a royal order of 29 October 1836, Queen Regent Maria Christina suppressed the university in Alcalá and ordered its move to Madrid, where it took the name of Literary University and, in 1851, of Central University (Universidad Central).

Alfonso XIII, King of Spain, with Faculty members of the university: Albert Einstein, José Rodríguez Carracido, Blas Cabrera y Felipe, among others, on 11 March 1923.

The Central University awarded Albert Einstein a Doctor of Science degree Honoris Causa on 28 February 1923; this was the first Doctor of Science degree Honoris Causa that Albert Einstein accepted from a European university. In April 1933, Minister for Education and the Arts Fernando de los Ríos, announced that Einstein had agreed to take charge of a professorship in a research institute, which would bear the name Instituto Albert Einstein, under the university's School of Science. However, as the political situation began to deteriorate throughout Europe, Einstein ended up accepting a similar position at the Institute for Advanced Study in Princeton, New Jersey.

The university greatly expanded during the 19th century, and its accommodations in central Madrid proved to be increasingly inadequate. Besides the greater number of students, after its move from Alcalá the university had been based in a number of preexisting, government-acquired properties – mainly aristocratic mansions and royal châteaux from centuries past, abandoned by their owners for more contemporary lodgings. Though they were not without their charm, the ancient buildings were not ideal as educational settings, and the early 20th century witnessed the students of the Central University attending philosophy lectures and anatomy lessons in elaborate spaces that had served as ballrooms and salons only a few decades prior.

This situation changed in 1927, when by royal decree King Alfonso XIII ceded state-held lands in the proximity of the Palace of La Moncloa to establish space for the University of Madrid. At the time, this constituted all of the land between the Royal Palace and the Palace of El Pardo, and today it comprises a vast swath of western Madrid referred to as the "Ciudad Universitaria", or University City of Madrid.

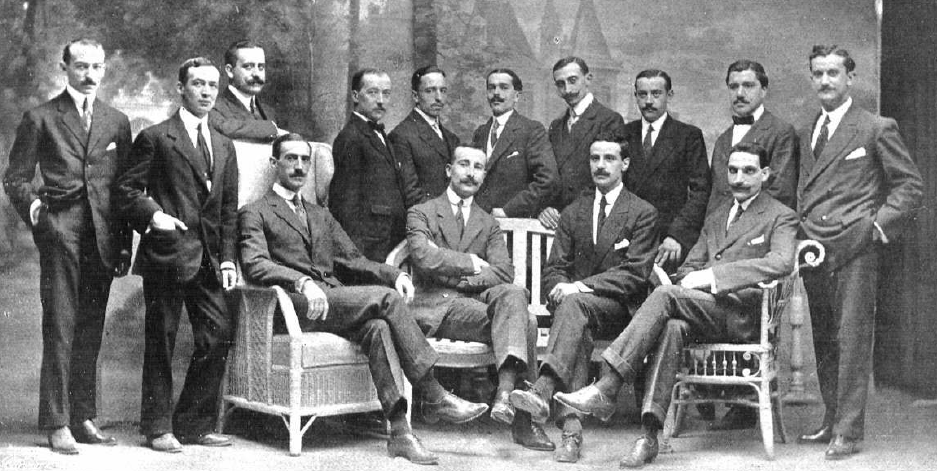
Engineers graduated in 1913 from the Complutense University.

A council appointed by King Alfonso XIII had decided that the new University of Madrid would require the innovative architecture and planning. A team of academics was sent on an international expedition to visit the most prestigious universities in Europe and North America, to combine the best of both continents and design the utopian academic setting. The trip took them to 19 universities in the American northeast, as well as to Paris, Lyon, Oxford, Berlin, Hamburg, and numerous other European cities, all in an effort to discern the best possible building structure. The architectural tendencies of the era, however, ended up having a greater influence than the academics' visits to Harvard, the University of Pennsylvania, La Sorbonne or the University of Berlin; while the final plans from this period are hardly recognizable to anyone familiar with the contemporary campus, the buildings from the era that managed to survive the design revisions, the Civil War and the Franco regime betray the period's fondness for the German Bauhaus movement. Indeed, the original buildings, exemplary amongst them the Schools of Medicine, Pharmacy and Odontology, are an homage to structural functionalism and the graceful utilitarianism of the 1920s.

In the 1970s, following the political instability of the regime of Francisco Franco, the University of Madrid was renamed, dividing existing colleges between the Complutense University of Madrid and the Technical University of Madrid. When the city of Alcalá de Henares decided to open a university within the older campus buildings, it was named Universidad de Alcalá de Henares to clearly distinguish it from the Complutense University.

== Today ==
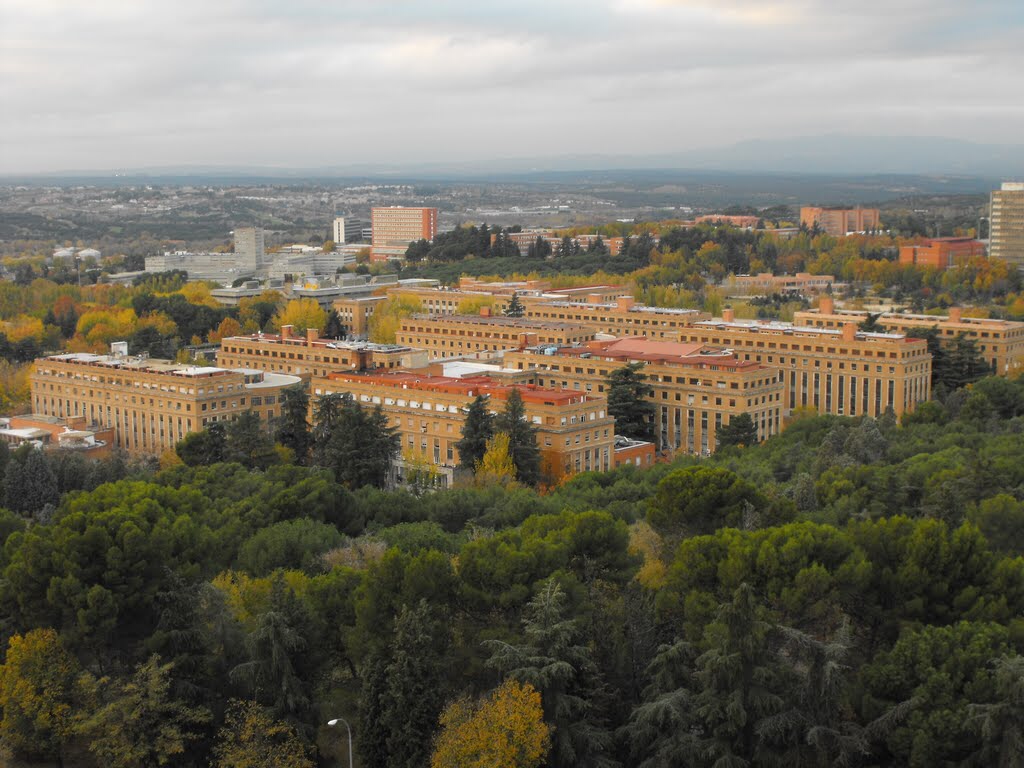
University City of Madrid

The University of Madrid has played a major role in the political development of Spain since its founding. Its graduates have been members, at either congressional or ministerial level, in all of the governments of Spain since the Enlightenment, and their positions in the Second Spanish Republic and the post-Franco transition to democracy were particularly notable. The former first deputy prime minister, María Teresa Fernández de la Vega, and the former president, José María Aznar, are both graduates of the university. The Complutense University has also played host to some of the most significant figures of the intellectual world, with a long tradition of visiting professors amongst which feature some of the greats of world academia (most notably, Albert Einstein). A significant part of the European intelligentsia flocked to its halls during the 1930s, when democratic Spain provided a refuge from the rising terrors of fascism. The contemporary Complutense University has also counted numerous Nobel Laureates not only among its graduates, but also its faculty members over the years.

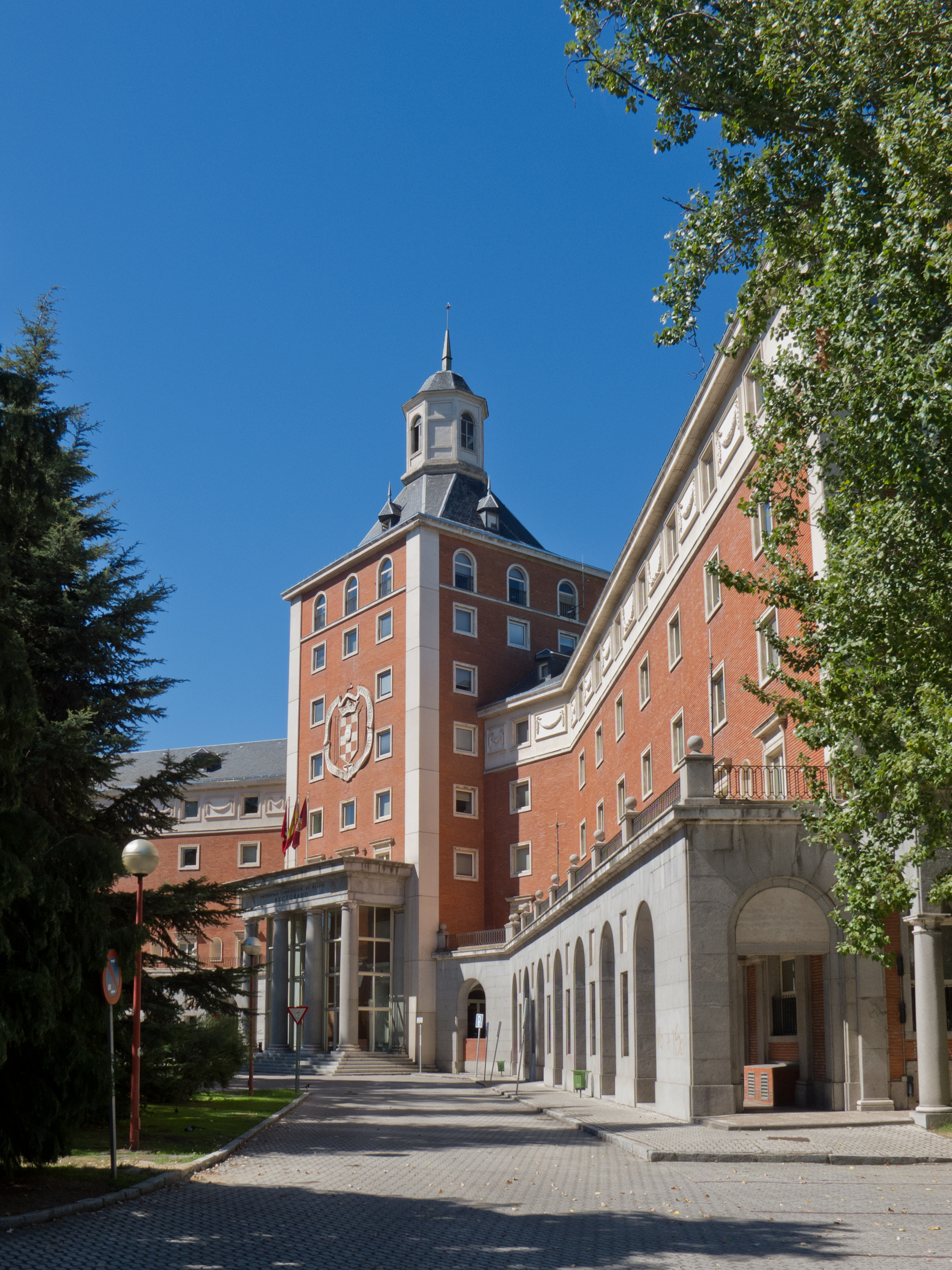
Rectorate building of the Complutense University.

Currently, the Complutense University is the largest university in Spain. During the 2004–2005 academic year the university recorded an enrollment of 91,598 students and employed a staff of 9,500, of which over 6000 are directly involved in teaching duties; the university operates on government subsidies, grants and enrollment funds, with a current annual budget of over €500,000,000 . The university currently offers nearly 80 possible majors, 230 individual degrees, and 221 doctorate programs. The university has over 30 libraries, with over 2 million works in print, a particularly rich archive of over 90,000 historical documents, and one of the most extensive film collections in Europe.

Due to its long history in the capital, the Complutense University enjoys great support from Madrid-based institutions, at a local, national and international level. The School of Medicine operates the Hospital Clínico Universitario de San Carlos, Hospital Gregorio Marañón, and the most famous one, Hospital 12 October, as well as a number of other specialized clinics located on-campus, some of which are operated jointly with the Ministry of Health or perform specific research for the ministry. The School of Medicine is not the only one with government involvement; indeed, despite past conflicts, the Complutense University shares a close bond with the Spanish government, as both the prime-ministerial residence of La Moncloa and the Spanish Constitutional Court are located directly on-campus (with the political centre of the city within walking distance).

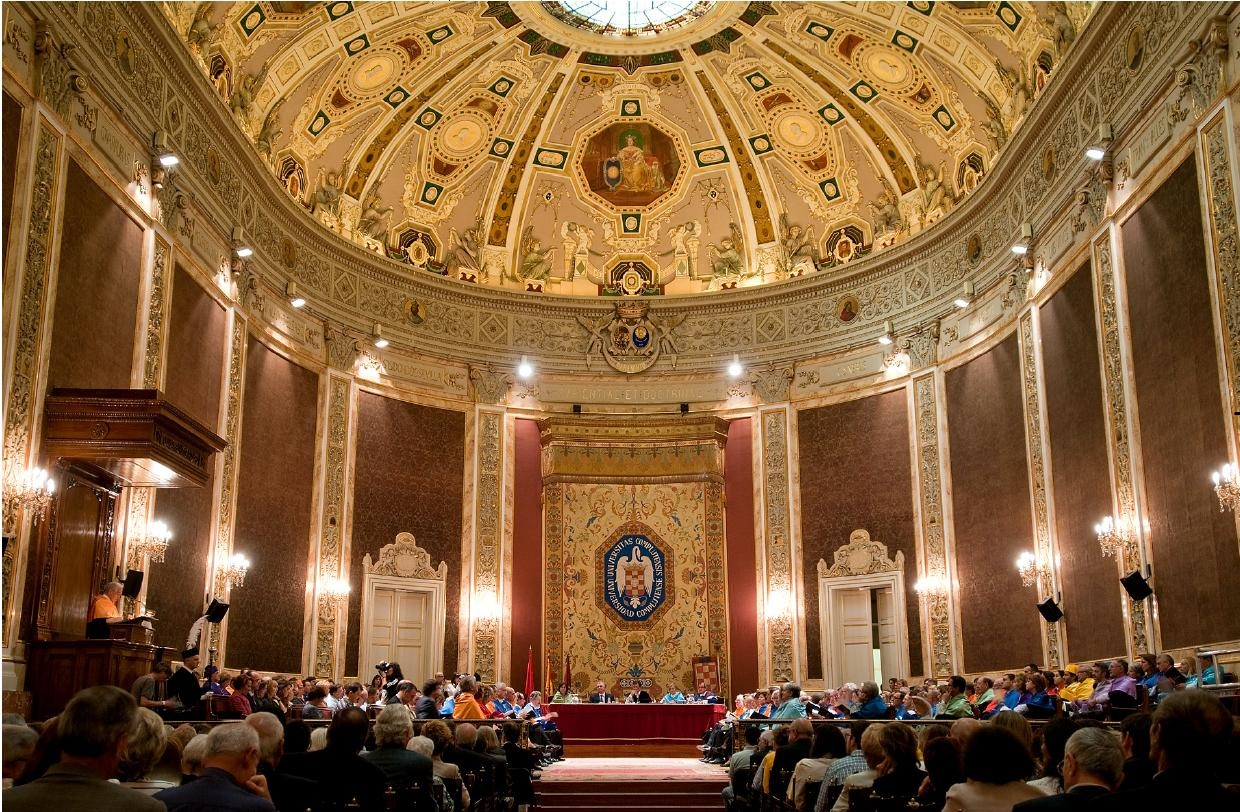
Auditorium of Universidad Complutense.

The School of Communications, meanwhile, enjoys equally good relations with the press (large part of its professors being former reporters, editors, or directors of major Spanish and international newspapers). Moreover, the school is known particularly for its role as one of the premiere pre-screening locales in Spain- all major Spanish film productions are screened first before an audience of Complutense students, with the main actors or production figures of the films attending a post-screening press conference. Most recently, Blanca Portillo, Carmen Maura, Lola Dueñas and Yohana Cobo pre-screened Pedro Almodóvar's Volver; past pre-screening visitors have included director Santiago Segura, actor Alejo Sauras, and writer E. Annie Proulx.

The Faculty of Fine Arts was created in 1978, and now offers first degrees in fine arts, design, and preservation and restoration of artistic patrimony; as well as postgraduate magister's and doctorate degrees.

Each year, the Madrid Círculo de Bellas Artes extends invitations to Complutense students during its series of annual conferences featuring philosophers, sociologists, and psychologists. Likewise, the faculties have hosted lectures given by figures from various fields, including singer-songwriter and Catalan activist Joan Manuel Serrat, historian Ernst Gombrich, writer Umberto Eco, and politician Santiago Carrillo. Alejandro Amenábar wrote his first film, Tesis, while attending Complutense University. The on-campus scenes in the film were shot in the School of Communications, which Amenábar attended, and the building serves as a device in the plot.

== Student life and extracurricular activities ==
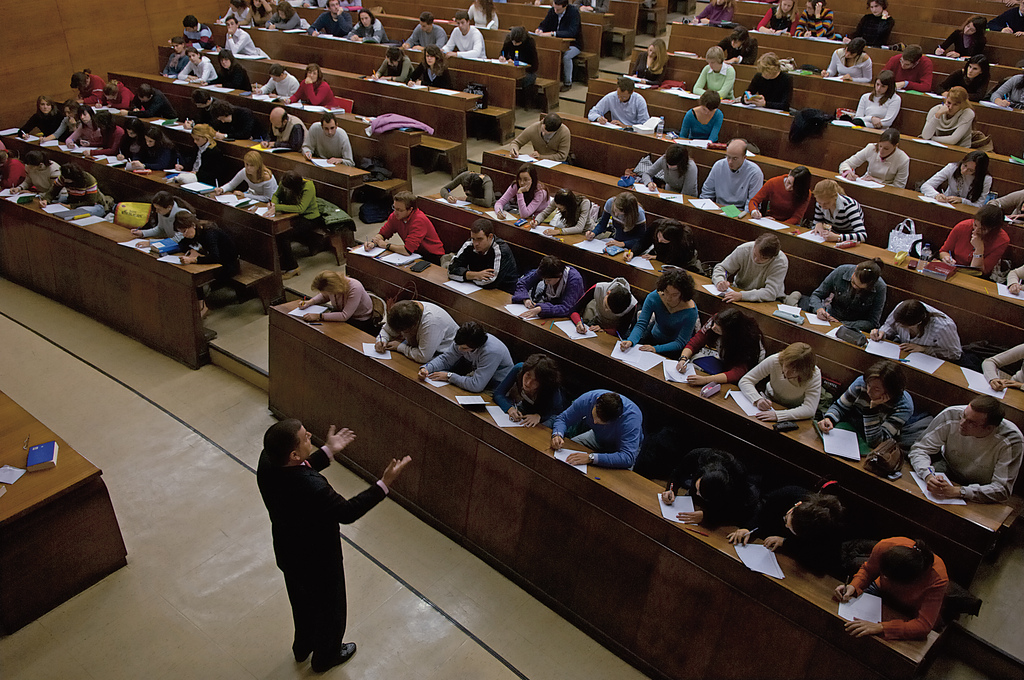
Professor giving a lecture at the Complutense University of Madrid (Madrid, 2005).

The Complutense University publishes a bi-monthly newspaper, the Gaceta Complutense, and also features a fully operational radio station, Radio Complutense (107.5 FM), which broadcasts for 12 hours daily; both are run from the School of Communications.

While the university has a select number of registered dormitories, these are located on the fringes of the campus within bordering neighborhoods, and therefore no students truly live on the campus proper. Due to the costs, and the fact that university-affiliated lodging is not required, the majority of the Complutense's students live independently, either in non-affiliated dormitories or in actual apartments.

The University of Madrid is home to over 100 student political, social and sports-related groups. Aerobics, gym, yoga, swimming, tennis, diving, tai chi, and numerous other courses are offered. In terms of team sports, the Complutense features male and female basketball, football, and volleyball divisions, as well as rugby. Chess, badminton, golf, judo, karate, table-tennis, and archery teams are also available. Internal university games are held several times a year, with all of the different schools competing; the Complutense also participates in the regional university games, held each March at the Puerta del Hierro Stadium in Madrid, and selected national competitions. All students, professors, staff members, and family of staff members have the right to be evaluated and attended to at the Complutense University Center for Sport and Fitness Medicine.

== The Complutense Abroad ==
Besides an extensive series of accords permitting student/professor exchanges and study abroad opportunity with prestigious universities throughout the world, the Complutense University of Madrid currently operates four full-time institutions outside of Spain.

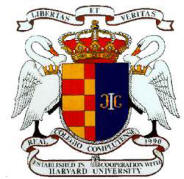
Coat of arms of the Real Colegio Complutense at Harvard University

- The Real Colegio Complutense at Harvard University (Cambridge, Massachusetts): The RCC was founded as a joint cooperative institution to foster intellectual and scientific interaction between Harvard University and Complutense, with the support of HM King Juan Carlos I, HM Queen Sofía of Spain and the Commonwealth of Massachusetts. It follows the tradition of the Royal Spanish College, founded in 1364 to host Spanish Visiting Scholars at the University of Bologna. The RCC accord is the only one of its sort ever to have been approved by Harvard. The institution is directed jointly by the President of Harvard and the Rector of Complutense University, with an academic council formed by 5 Harvard professors and 5 Complutense professors. It permits a select number of Complutense professors to conduct their research at Harvard as visiting scholars. RCC Fellows enjoy the same privileges as Harvard's non-tenured faculty. Each year the institution hosts the RCC Fellows Lectures, a conference cycle during which the visiting scholars deliver lectures revealing the results of their investigations to an audience of Harvard professors and students. Finally, it also permits a small number of students to attend doctoral school at the university as research associates, under scholarships hosted by the Spanish royal family.
- Collège des Hautes Études Européennes Miguel Servet (Paris, France): founded upon the initiative of the Club Européen des Recteurs, the Collège des Hautes Études Européennes Miguel Servet is a Franco-Iberian center of learning and research located within the La Sorbonne. Besides specialized degrees, it offers programs focused on jurisprudence and economy within the European Union, a double-major program in Franco-Iberian law, and the Diplôme de Formation Européenne, which is operates under the auspices of the European Union and UNESCO. It was awarded a status of 'centre d'excellence', and in 1995 it opened chapters in Italy, Portugal, and South America.
- Cátedra Complutense en la Universidad de Karlova (Prague, Czech Republic): Full campus in operation, offering bachelor and doctoral degrees in partnership with Charles University (Univerzita Karlova v Praze) in Prague.
- Cátedra Dubcek (Bratislava, Slovakia): Full campus in operation, offering bachelor and doctoral degrees in partnership with Comenius University in Bratislava.

== International rankings ==
University rankings

Global – Overall
- ARWU World: 301–400 (2023)
- QS World: =187 (2026)
- THE World: 501–600 (2024)
- USNWR Global: =337 (2023)

In the Shanghai Ranking, the UCM is ranked among the best 300 worldwide, and among the top 3 Spanish ones. In the QS World University Ranking, the UCM is the #164 worldwide, #58 in Europe, and #1 in Spain. In the Scimago institution rankings, the UCM is #175 worldwide, #79 in research, and #3 in Spain. Besides, internationally it is in the top 3% overall, in the top 2% in research, and top 3% in social impact.

== Notable faculty ==
- Antonio Brú (born 1962), theoretical physicist and permanent professor in the Department of Applied Mathematics
- José María de Azcárate (1919–2001), art historian, author, researcher, curator, and professor, specializing in medieval Castilian art and Renaissance sculpture. Azcárate was the Chair of History of Medieval Art at Complutense University of Madrid from 1973, until his death in 2001.
- Francisco de Santiago y Calderón (1669–1736), rector of the university, later a bishop in Mexico.
- María Ángeles Durán (born 1942), sociologist and economist
- Gonzalo Trancho (born 1955), professor in the Zoology and Anthropology Department.
- Juan Luis Arsuaga (born 1954), professor in the Paleontology Department of the Faculty of Geological Sciences.
- Fernando Savater (born 1947), professor of Ethics in the Faculty of Philosophy and Letters of the Complutense University.
- David Hernández de la Fuente (born 1974), professor in the Department of Classics at the Complutense University.
- Mario Alvarez Ledesma, lawyer, politician, and professor, and author.
- Javier de Felipe (born 1953), biologist researcher in Cajal Institute.
- Alicia Gómez Montano (born 1955), professor of journalism at the Faculty of Information Science.
- Gonzalo Álvarez Chillida (born 1958), tenured professor of the history of Thought and Social and Political Movements at the Complutense University.
- María Vallet-Regí (born 1946), tenured professor of inorganic chemistry and heads the Smart Biomaterials group at the Complutense University.
- Manuel Sánchez Cuesta (born 1942), professor of Ethics in the Faculty of Philosophy and Letters of the Complutense University.
- Juan Manuel Rodríguez Parrondo (born 1964), professor of physics in the Faculty of Physics and Chemistry.
- Alfredo Alvar (born 1960), associated professor at the Complutense University, specialized in modern history.
- José Cobo Cano (born 1965), archbishop of Roman Catholic Archdiocese of Madrid.
- Ana Baschwitz (1960–2022), journalist, publicist, professor at the Faculty of Communication Sciences.

== Alumni ==
In recent years, the university's notable alumni include 7 Nobel Prize recipients, 18 Prince of Asturias Awardees, 7 Miguel de Cervantes Prize recipients, 10 ERC grantees, as well as prime ministers of Spain, European Commissioners, presidents of the EU Parliament, a European Council secretary general, European Central Bank Executive Board members, a NATO secretary general, a UNESCO director general, an IMF managing director, Spanish royalty, and heads of state. Over the course of seven centuries, the University of Madrid has provided invaluable contributions in the sciences, fine arts, and political leadership. Alumni include renowned philosophers (José Ortega y Gasset, Eugenio María de Hostos, Ignatius of Loyola, Thomas of Villanova), writers (Federico García Lorca, Antonio de Nebrija, Pedro Calderón de la Barca), scientists (Santiago Ramón y Cajal, Severo Ochoa, Andrés Manuel del Río, Ricardo Rubio), historians (Juan de Mariana, Juan Ginés de Sepúlveda, María Luz Navarro Mayor), military leaders (Don John of Austria, Alexander Farnese), and foreign leaders (Cardinal Mazarin, José Rizal).

== See also ==
- University of Alcalá
- Complutensian Polyglot Bible
