= Isidoro Marín Garés =

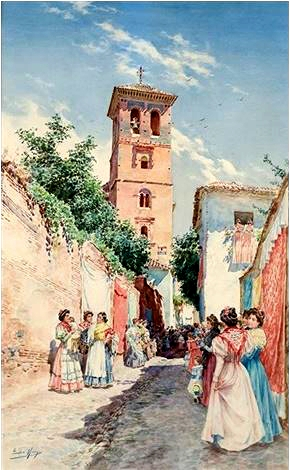
Procession in Granada

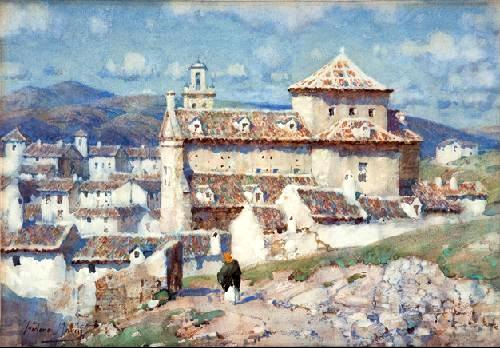
View of Antequera

Isidoro Marín Garés (14 July 1863, Granada - 1926, Granada) was a Spanish painter, ceramicist and art restorer.

== Biography ==
He studied at the "Escuela de Bellas Artes de Granada", where his primary instructors were Julián Sanz del Valle (c.1830-after 1901) and Eduardo García Guerra.

Owing to his precarious financial situation, he practiced a wide variety of artistic activities; including illustrations, posters and lithographs, in addition to the usual paintings, which he made on a variety of media, such as wood, cloth, ceramics and fans. He also did decorative painting for some of the most distinguished families of Granada and worked as an art restorer. For a time, he was a conservator at the Alhambra.

His professional resumé includes working as a teacher at the "School of Arts and Crafts", and as an assistant to Manuel Gómez-Moreno González, where Ismael González de la Serna numbered among his apprentices.

He exhibited outside of Granada on only one occasion: the 1888 Barcelona Universal Exposition; holding a small showing simultaneously at the Sala Parés.

The works of Mariano Fortuny had a major influence on him; also taking elements from Impressionism, which he applied within a costumbrista aesthetic. Today, he is especially well-remembered for his watercolors.

He was member of the Centro Artístico, Literario y Científico de Granada and the "Avellana Brotherhood", a cultural and literary society identified with the Generation of '98, as well as being a co-founder of the local watercolorists' society.

== Sources ==
- Biography and works @ the Museo del Prado
- Eduardo Dizy Caso, Les orientalistes de l'école espagnole, ACR Editions, Courveboie, 1997 ISBN 2-86770-106-6 Online @ Google Books
- Biography @ the Ayuntamiento de Granada
