= Faculty of Philosophy and Letters of the Complutense University =

Faculty of Philosophy and Letters
- Facultad de Filosofía y Letras
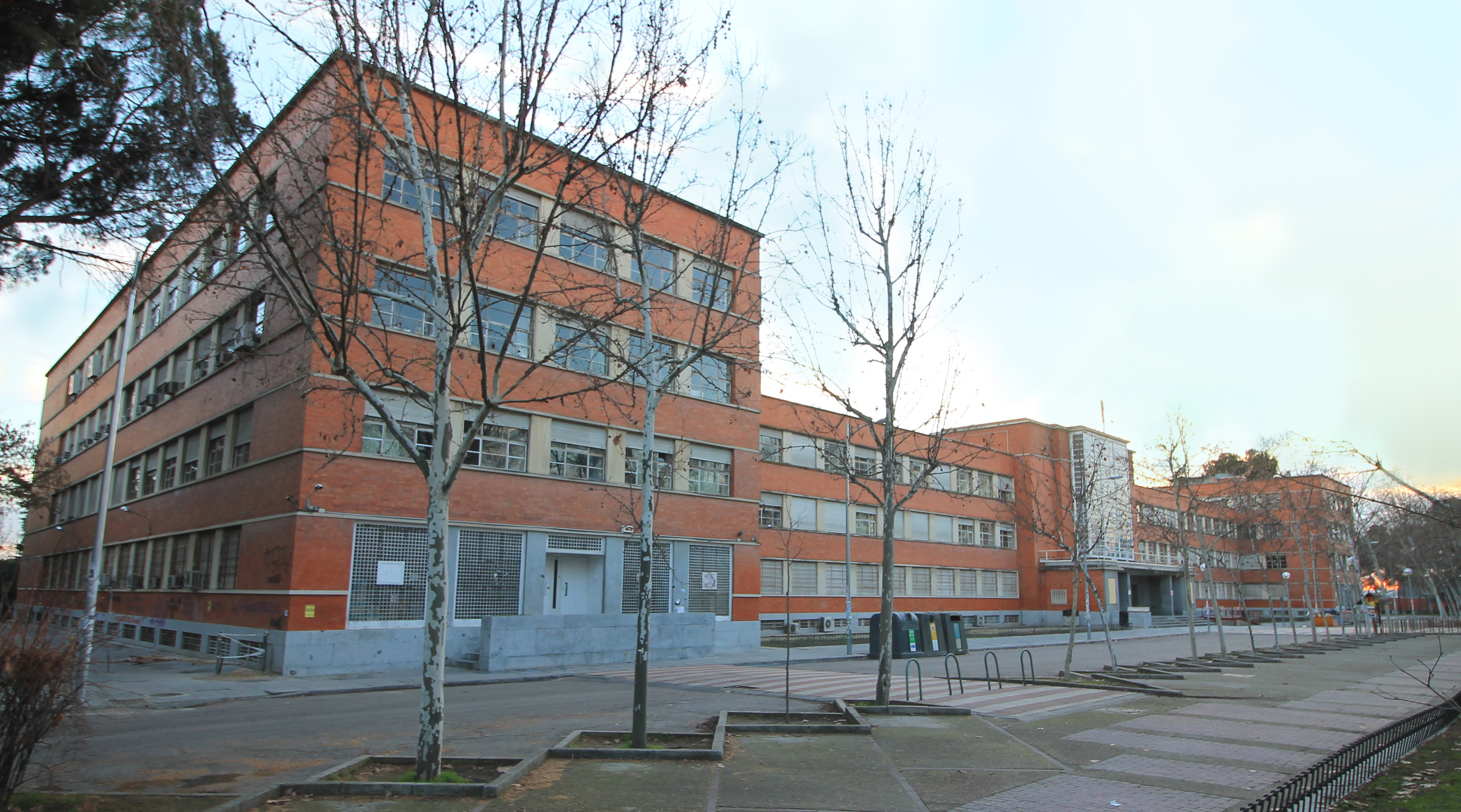
- Interactive map of the Faculty of Philosophy and Letters area

General information
- Architectural style: rationalism
- Classification: Bien de Interés Cultural
- Location: Plaza de Menéndez Pelayo, Madrid, Spain
- Coordinates: 40.448846°N 3.730482°W
- Current tenants: UCM's School of Philosophy; UCM's School of Philology
- Construction started: 1932
- Completed: 1936
- Inaugurated: 1933; 1943

Design and construction
- Architect: Agustín Aguirre López

The Faculty of Philosophy and Letters is a building in Madrid, Spain, part of the Complutense University of Madrid's Moncloa Campus.

An example of rationalist architecture, it was projected in 1931–32 by Agustín Aguirre López as the southern end of a closed compound intending to gather the academic disciplines of humanities of the Central University. The first part of the building was inaugurated in 1933. Figures such as Ortega y Gasset, Américo Castro, Manuel García Morente, Xavier Zubiri, María de Maeztu, Manuel Gómez-Moreno, Claudio Sánchez Albornoz and Elías Tormo taught at the building. While the final part was expected to be inaugurated by 1936, the Civil War aborted such plans, and the building was subject of heavy damage by Francoist artillery as it became the headquarters of the XI International Brigade. It was thus re-inaugurated after undertaking a reconstruction in 1943. The School of Philosophy and Letters was divided in Geography and History, Philology, Philosophy, and Education Sciences in 1974, and the building currently houses just the schools of Philosophy and Philology.

Described as "the most emblematic [building] at the Ciudad Universitaria and the one that has endured best the past of time, as it has preserved its architectural configuration with no expansions nor substantial modifications", it was declared Bien de Interés Cultural in 2017.
