= Mario Álvarez =

Mario Álvarez may refer to:

- Mario Moisés Álvarez, Mexican researcher
- Mario Roberto Álvarez (1913–2011), Argentinean architect
- Mario Álvarez Dugan (1931–2008), Dominican journalist
- Mario Álvarez (table tennis) (born 1960), represented Dominican Republic at the 1988 Summer Olympics and participated in table tennis at the Pan American Games
- Pedro Mario Álvarez (born 1982), Spanish football player
- Mario Álvarez (singer) (born 1985), Spanish singer and winner of 7th series of Operación Triunfo
- Mario Alvarez Ledesma, Mexican lawyer and politician
