= Gonzalo Trancho =

Spanish anthropologist (born 1955)

Gonzalo Javier Trancho Gayo (Madrid, 8 February 1955) is a Spanish anthropologist.

He obtained doctor and bachelor degrees in Biological Sciences at the Universidad Complutense de Madrid, where he is also a professor in the Zoology and Anthropology Department. His thesis dealt with a cell biology study of populations of Nilotides and he has taken part in several researches in Spain and more countries (for instance, El hombre arcaico costero: su biodiversidad y bioadaptación, Chile). He's a member of the Asociación Española de Paleopatología.

== Partial bibliography ==
- Paleodieta de la población ibérica de Villasviejas del Tamuja : análisis de la necrópolis de el Mercadillo (Botija, Cáceres), 1998.
- Dieta, indicadores de salud y caracterización biomorfológica de la población medieval musulmana de Xarea (Vélez Rubio, Almería), 1998.
- Investigaciones antropológicas en España, 1997.
