= José María de Azcárate =

- Born: José María de Azcárate y Ristori; 18 April 1919; Vigo, Spain
- Died: 18 July 2001 (aged 82); Madrid, Spain
- Known for: Art history publications and research

José María de Azcárate y Ristori (18 April 1919 – 18 July 2001) was a Spanish art historian, author, researcher, curator, and professor, specializing in medieval Castilian art and Renaissance sculpture.

== Biography ==
Born 18 April 1919 in Vigo, in the province of Pontevedra, Spain. His father was a sailor and early in his son's life he moved the family to Cádiz, Spain. He studied at University of Seville and at University of Madrid in the subjects of Philosophy and Literature, eventually earning a doctorate from University of Madrid. He was disciple of Manuel Gómez-Moreno Martinez.

Azcárate authored many art history books, including a History of Art, also known as El Azcárate, used by many students studying philosophy and letters. He also authored the thirteenth volume of Ars Hispaniae; historia universal del arte hispánico (1949), a book series on the art history of Spain.

Azcárate was the Chair of History of Medieval Art at Complutense University of Madrid from 1973, until his death in 2001. He died at the age of 82 on 18 July 2001, of a heart attack at his home in Madrid, Spain. He was buried in a cemetery in Almudena.

== Awards and memberships ==
In 1974, he joined membership to the San Fernando Royal Academy of Fine Arts with the topic "El protogótico hispánico" and he was additionally a member of the royal academies of Valladolid, Seville, Toledo, A Coruña, Cadiz and Barcelona.

He was awarded with the National Prize for Literature (Spain) by Alonso Berruguete in 1961. The University of Alicante awarded Azcárate with an honorary doctorate degree in 1991.
