= Mario Alvarez Ledesma =

Mexican lawyer and politician

Mario Ignacio Álvarez Ledesma is a Mexican lawyer, politician, and professor, author of law and human rights books and articles. He has been First Visitor General of the National Human Rights Commission (CNDH) (1997-1998) has served as Executive Director of the Human Rights National Center of the National Human Rights Commission (CNDH). Álvarez has given a chair in Universidad de Anáhuac, Universidad Latinoamericana, Instituto Tecnológico Autónomo de México, the Law School unit at the National Autonomous University of Mexico, Universidad de Nápoles Federico II, Istituto Italiano per gli Studi Filosofici and the Law School of Universidad de Perugia. Member of the “Claustro de Doctores” at the National Autonomous University of Mexico

== Early life and education ==
Mario Álvarez Ledesma had his academic formation in Mexico and Spain. He earned his bachelor's degree in the Anahuac University and his master's degree in the Institutes of Comparative Law and Human Rights at Complutense University of Madrid, Spain. His doctorate in law is from the National Autonomous University of Mexico. In the 1980s, he was a student of Gregorio Peces-Barba, who was the head of a group of intellectuals at the Human Rights Institute of the Complutense University of Madrid.

== Career ==
Mario Ignacio Álvarez Ledesma is a Mexican lawyer and politician, and the author of many books related to the introduction in the study of Law and Human Rights. He is a fluent speaker of Spanish, English, and Italian.

He focuses his attention on theory of law, the theory of justice and the human rights because one of his goals is to create a culture that values human rights. The legal education isan important issue in Mexico. "I've been going through those areas of knowledge, mainly because of the social problems I have lived and the necessity of renewing literature and the ways to teach, the ways lawyers are taught, according to the necessities, intellectual innovations and the time we are living on", according to Álvarez.

He has been First Visitor General of the National Human Rights Commission (CNDH) (1997-1998). His work as Executive Director of the Human Rights National Center of the National Human Rights Commission (CNDH) (1999-2000), General Director of the Human Right Protections in the Attorney General of Mexico (2001-2003), and Human Rights Assistant Attorney, Care for Victims and Community Services(2003-2006) in the Attorney General of Mexico.

He has been a professor in the law school of the Anahuac University, ITAM (Instituto Tecnológico Autónomo de México), and in the National Autonomous University of Mexico. He is the co-founder of Anahuac University law school's journal. In 1993, he founded the law department in the UDLA (Universidad de la Américas, A.C.), and was the first to propose the creation of an academic program that combined subjects of the legal system of Mexico, USA, and Canada. He has taught courses and seminars in Mexico and abroad and has published various articles in legal magazines, specialized in topics related to Theory of Justice and human rights. Since January 2008, he is the director of the Department of Legal and Social Sciences at Tec de Monterrey Campus Ciudad de México.

== Awards and honors ==
In October 2006, the Universidad Autónoma de Baja California gave him the Honoris Causa Degree and since 2008, he is National Investigator. Álvarez held a chair in Universidad de Anáhuac, Universidad Latinoamericana, Instituto Tecnológico Autónomo de México, Unit of postgraduate studies in the Law School of the National Autonomous University of Mexico, Universidad de Nápoles Federico II, Istituto Italiano per gli Studi Filosofici and the Law School of Universidad de Perugia. He earned ten years of work at the National Autonomous University of Mexico (UNAM), in February 2009, He is ranked as a level I researcher with the National System of Researchers, January 2009. He was honored with an Honoris Causa Doctor Degree, Autonomous University of Baja California, August 2006. Currently, he is a member of the "Claustro de Doctores" at the National Autonomous University of Mexico.

== Problems with the PGR (Attorney General of Mexico) ==
As part of the reviews made by the new administration of the Attorney General of México, financial irregularities were detected in Álvarez's expenses as a First Visitor General of human rights. according to official sources, they detected that he did not declare some of the expenses he made. Álvarez has an expenditure of around 300 thousand pesos as personal expenses used in November 2006 in Baja California, México.

== Bibliography ==
- "Introducción al Derecho" Leonel Pereznieto made a review of this book during his period in the ITAM (Instituto Tecnológico Autónomo de México).
- "Fundamentos de Derecho I"
- "Conceptos Jurídicos Fundamentales"
- "Acerca del concepto Derechos Humanos"
- "Teoría general de la interpretación" alongside Manuel Hallivis Pelayo
- "Diccionario Analítico de Derechos Humanos e Interpretación Regional" alongside Roberto Alvarez Ledesma and Roberto Cippitani
- "Derechos Humanos y Victimas del Delito"
