= Manuel Sánchez Cuesta =

Philosopher, ethicist and humanist (born 1952)

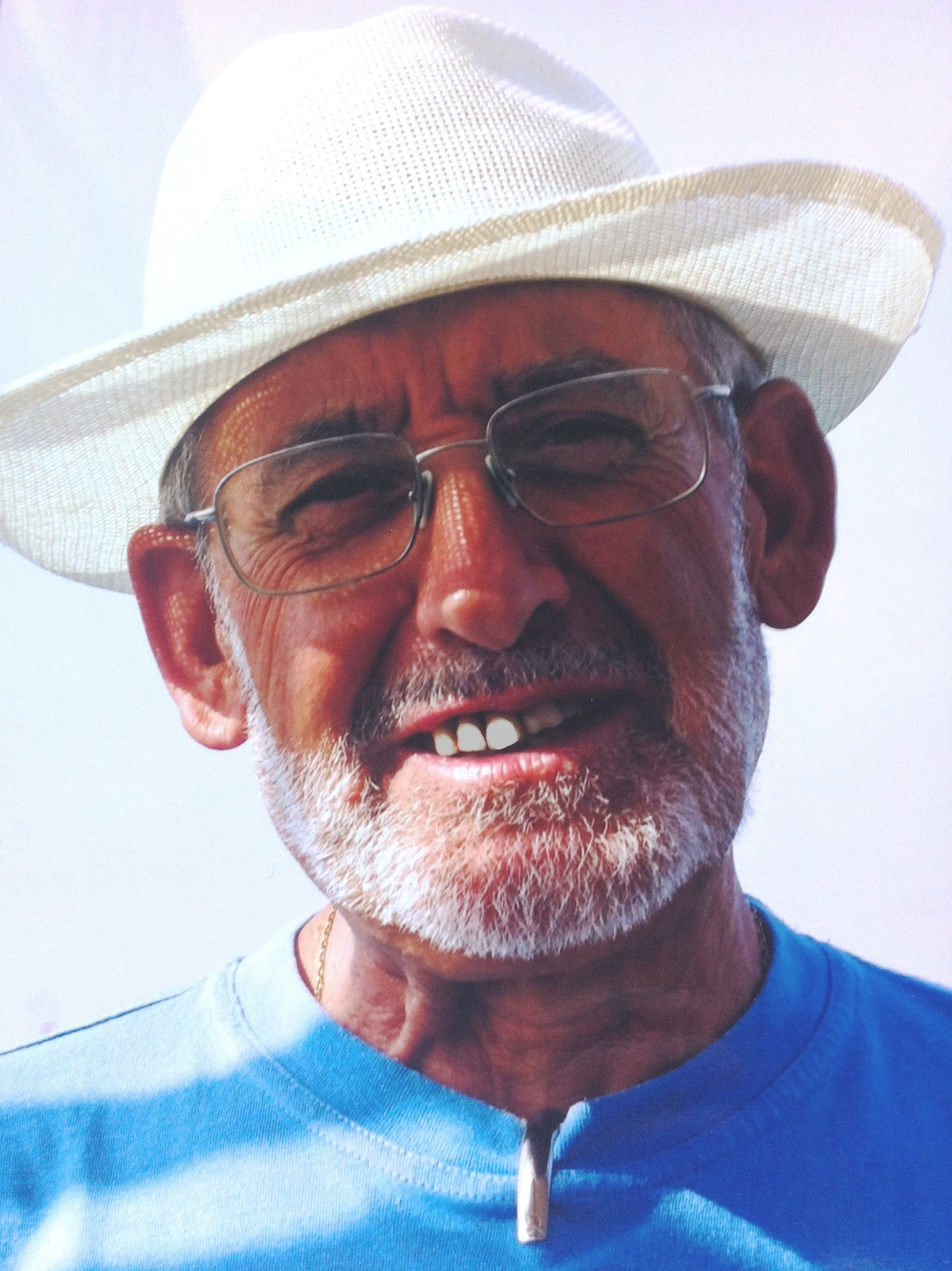
Manuel Sánchez Cuesta Spanish philosopher

Manuel Sánchez Cuesta (born 13 May 1952, in San Martín del Castañar, Salamanca) is a philosopher, ethicist and humanist.

He studied in the University of Salamanca, Complutense University of Madrid, Heidelberg University and the Pontifical University of Saint Thomas Aquinas in Rome. He is Philosophical Doctor. Since 1991 he is professor of ethics in the Complutense University of Madrid. He has also taught logic at the same university, Spanish literature and Spanish history of philosophy at the Heidelberg University as well as ethics at the Pontifical Catholic University of Puerto Rico. Amongst other publications, he has regularly written about ethics and politics in the newspaper Diario 16, the paper Acontecimiento, as well as about history of philosophy in the weekly magazine El Médico.

== Intellectual profile ==
His areas of research have focussed on the subjects of logic, history of philosophy and, in particular, ethics. In the existential-personalistic humanism of Sánchez Cuesta the everyday stands in the center of his ethical reflection. It is in the everyday, in fact, where the time of each human being is transmuted into an indefinite number of possibilities that are permanently open him or her. In consequence, the person can not only be able to trace the goal that it aspires, but also provide it with a substantiating virtuous character. "Whoever succeeds - writes Agapito Maestre (translated) - to live his daily life morally, and this and no other is the therapeutic value of this work [Note: that of Sánchez Cuesta], will have managed to make the carpe diem of the classics [Note: philosophers] come true."

The following applies to the writings of Professor Sánchez Cuesta in general. As one of his books' review [The ethics of the Greeks (translated) or, La ética de los griegos (original title)] by Professor José Miguel Marinas summarizes: "And here is undoubtedly the main attraction of an elegant work with apparently simple looks: is the text of a free man, which is aimed at adult readers".

== Publications ==
=== Books ===
- La nueva matemática [The new mathematics], 1973, Madrid: Marsiega, ISBN 84-7103-030-6
- La nueva Lógica [The new logics], 1974, Madrid: Marsiega, ISBN 84-7103-075-6
- Fábula íntima del Libertador J. N. (Novela-Ensayo) [Intimate fable of the Liberator J. N.], 1988, Madrid: Andrómeda, ISBN 84-86181-23-2
- Aspectos religiosos, éticos y sociopolíticos en “San Manuel Bueno, mártir” de Miguel de Unamuno [Religious, ethical and sociopolitical aspects in “San Manuel Bueno, mártir” from Miguel de Unamuno], 1993, Madrid: Editorial de la Universidad Complutense (Doc. Thesis), D.L. M-5995-1993
- Cinco visiones de hombre [Five visions of men], 1993, Madrid: Visor Libros-Fundación LOEWE, ISBN 84-7522-480-6, 2. edition 2013, ISBN 978-84-9895-699-3
- La ética de los griegos [The ethics of the Greek], 2001, Madrid: Ediciones Clásicas, ISBN 84-7882-478-2
- Ética para la vida cotidiana [Ethics for daily life], 2003, Madrid: Ediciones del Orto, ISBN 84-7923-299-4, 2. edition 2004, ISBN 84-7923-343-5
- Preguntas éticas fundamentales [Fundamental ethical questions], 2013, Madrid: Ediciones del Orto, ISBN 84-7923-494-6, 2. edition 2013, OCLC 890297619

=== Essays ===
- Miguel de Unamuno. Epistolario y hermenéutica, in Revista de Filosofía, no. 10, 1993, Madrid: Universidad Complutense, ISSN 0214-4921
- El hombre como ser-proyecto, objeto formal de la antropología filosófica, in Anales del Seminario de Historia de la Filosofía, no. Extra, 1996, Madrid: Universidad Complutense, ISSN 0211-2337
- Voces: Burguesía, Cultura y Sujeto, in Diccionario de Pensamiento contemporáneo, 1997, Madrid: Ed. San Pablo, ISBN 84-285-1981-1
- Moralidad y escatología en Unamuno, in Ética y Sociología. Estudios en memoria del Profesor José Todolí Duque, 2000, Salamanca: Ed. San Esteban, ISBN 84-8260-075-3
- ¿Dónde están los filósofos? Hacia una filosofía como experiencia moral, in La sociedad ante los nuevos desafíos, Colección Pensamiento y Sociedad-Aula Universitaria, 2003, Burgos: Caja de Burgos, ISBN 84-87152-86-4
- Tras los pasos de Unamuno, Ortega y Séneca, in María Zambrano. La visión más transparente, (Coords. J.M. Beneyto y J.A. González Fuentes), 2004, Madrid: Trotta-Fundación Carolina, ISBN 84-8164-703-9
- María Zambrano y su tiempo. Notas para una biografía político-filosófica, in magazine METAPOLÍTICA, Mexico, (Vol. 8, no. 34, Marzo-Abril), 2004, ISSN 1405-4558
- Unamuno, reescritura filosófica del Quijote, in Huellas de Don Quijote. La presencia cultural de Cervantes, 2005, Madrid: Instituto de Humanidades Ángel Ayala-CEU, ISBN 84-86117-22-4
- Lo religioso y lo filosófico en Julián Marías, in magazine PAIDEIA, Madrid, no. 78, (Enero-Abril), 2007, ISSN 0214-7300 and in ANNALES Universitatis Mariae Curie-Sklodewska, Vol. XXXVI.1, 2011, ISSN 0137-2025
- En el laberinto de la existencia (Monólogo dialogado), Mexico, Transatlántica de Educación, no. 11, Julio-Diciembre, 2012, NIPO: 030-13-137-8
