= Auditorium of Universidad Complutense =

- Paraninfo de la Universidad Complutense (Spanish)
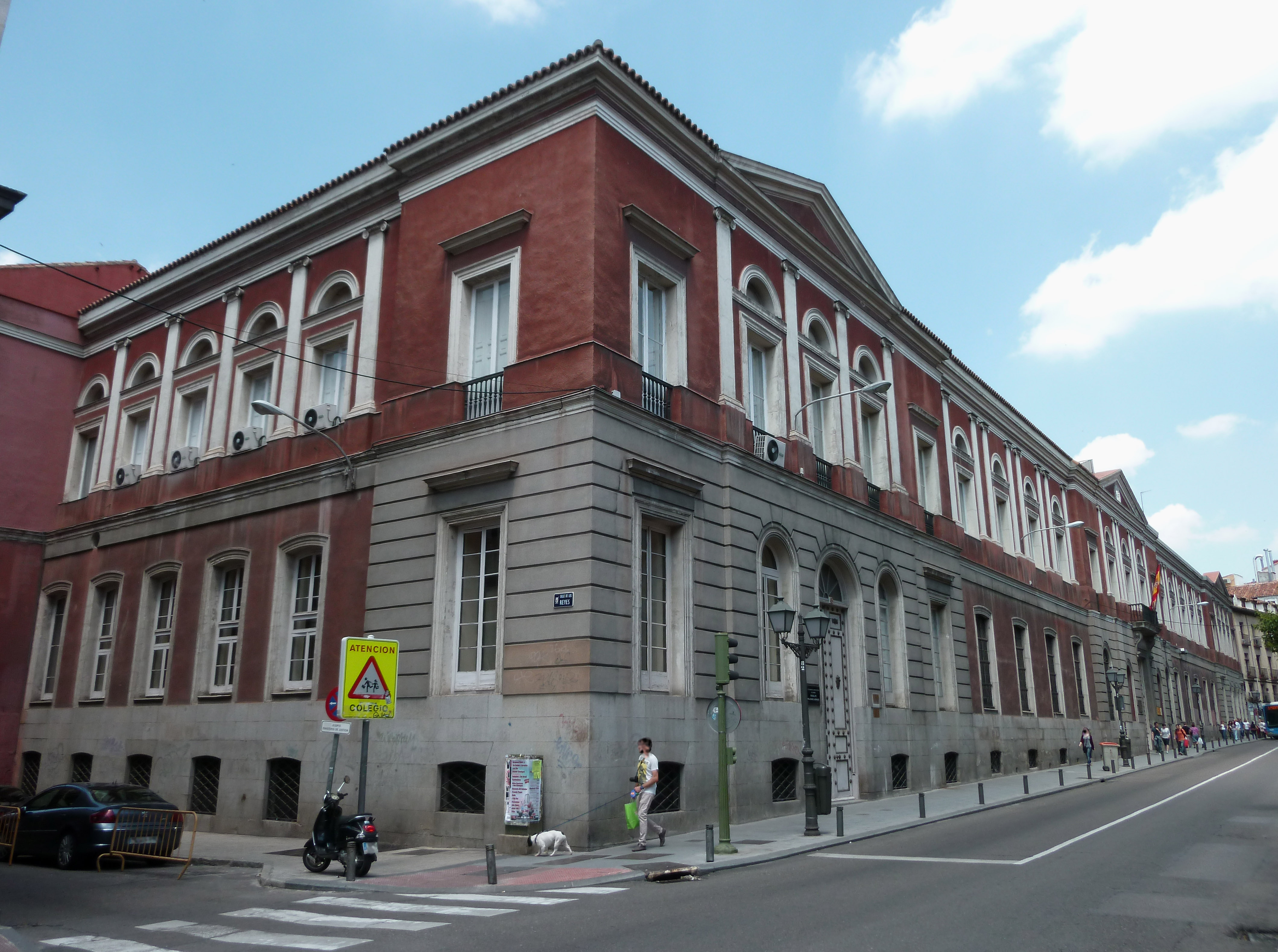

- Location within Spain
- 40.42501°N 3.707573°W
- Location: Madrid, Spain

Spanish Cultural Heritage
- Official name: Paraninfo de la Universidad Complutense
- Type: Non-movable
- Criteria: Monument
- Designated: 1980
- Reference no.: RI-51-0004437

The Auditorium of Universidad Complutense (Spanish: Paraninfo de la Universidad Complutense) is a building located in Madrid, Spain. It was declared Bien de Interés Cultural in 1980.
