= Universidad Latinoamericana =

Private university in Mexico City

Coordinates: 19.3613°N 99.1773°W

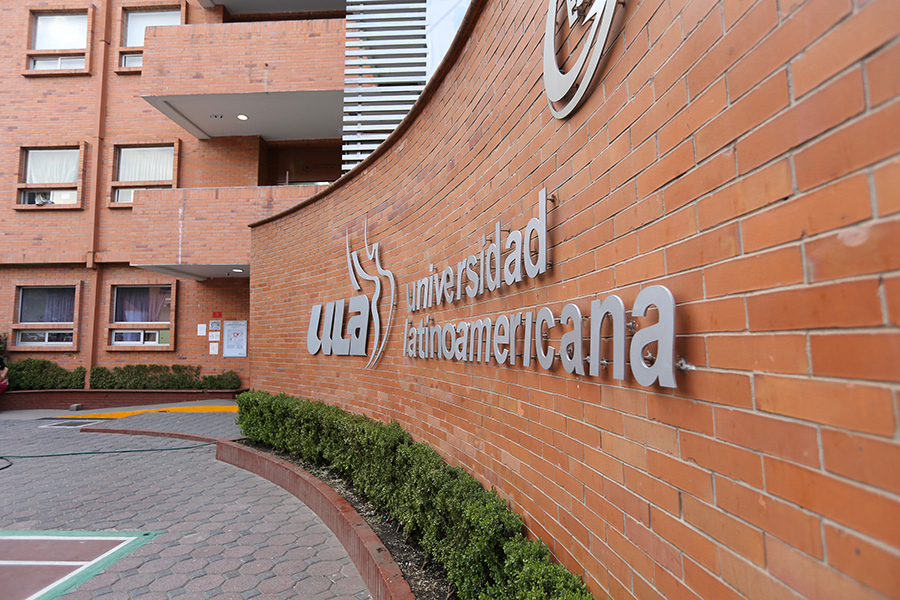
- ULA Campus Valle, Mexico City
- Type: Private university
- Established: 4 February 1976
- Location: Mexico City, Mexico
- Campus: Gabriel Mancera 1402, Col. Del Valle, Benito Juárez, Ciudad de México
- Website: ula.edu.mx

Universidad Latinoamericana is a private university in Mexico. It is part of Lottus Education, a Mexican Education Group. It offers Traditional programs, Executive Programs and Online programs for bachelor's degree, master's degree and specializations.

== History ==
The Universidad Latinoamericana was founded in 1975, with campus in Mexico City and the States of Morelos, Guanajuato & Querétaro. In 2019, it was acquired by Lottus Education.

== Campuses ==
The university has four traditional campuses: Valle, Florida, Norte and Cuernavaca. and 11 Executive Campus: Aragón, Coacalco, Coapa, El Rosario, Guaymas, León, Metepec, Querétaro, Reforma, Suroriente, Valle Dorado.

== Academic profile ==
Traditional campuses offers high school program, 24 bachelor's degree programs, 7 master's degrees and 6 specializations. Executive campuses offers 7 bachelor's degrees, 1 master's degree.
