= Manuel Gómez-Moreno González =

Spanish painter (1834–1918)

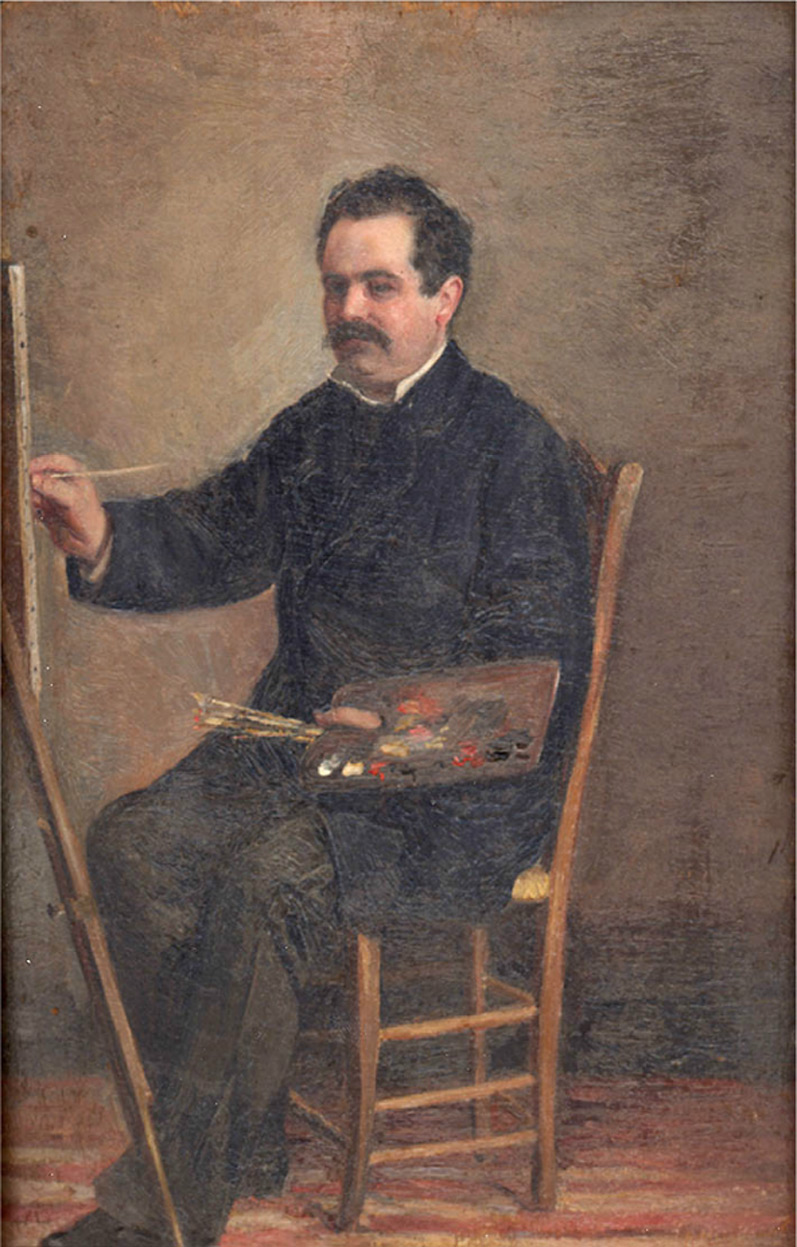
- Manuel Gómez-Moreno González,Self-portrait, 1878
- Born: 26 June 1834; Granada, Spain
- Died: 20 December 1918 (aged 84); Granada, Spain
- Education: Escuela de Bellas Artes, Granada; Academia de Bellas Artes de San Fernando, Madrid (1857-1860)
- Known for: Painter, illustrator, teacher, author

Manuel Gómez-Moreno González (26 June 1834 – 20 December 1918) was a Spanish painter, amateur archaeologist and professor. His son was the noted historian and archaeologist, Manuel Gómez-Moreno Martínez.

== Biography ==
He was born to a liberal family in Granada and was descended from "afrancesados". His father, owned a book store that carried out typography and book-binding.

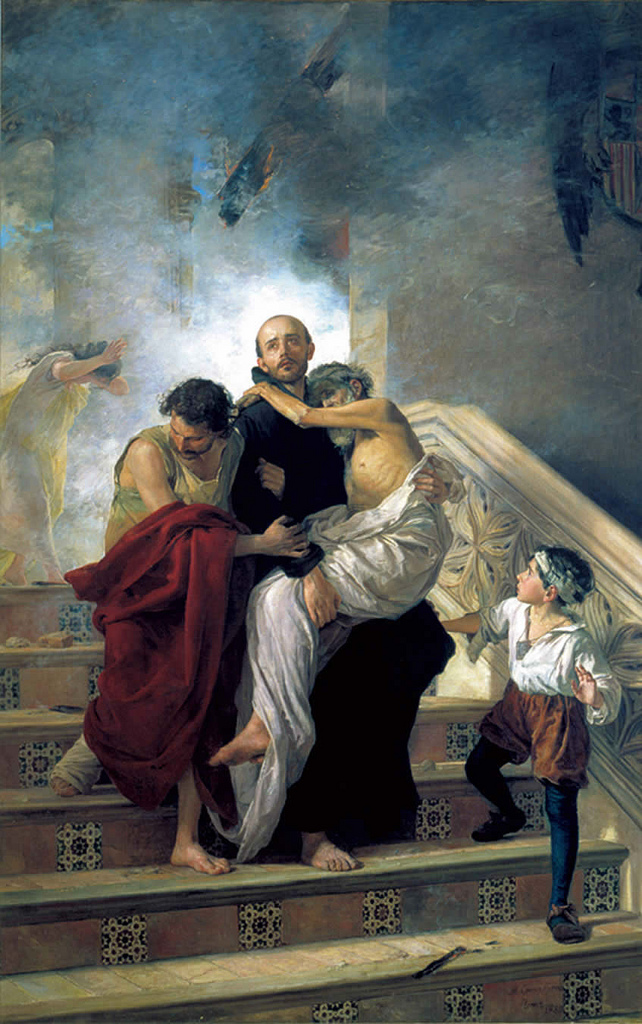
Saint John of God saving the Sick at the Royal Hospital

Upon discovering that he had a talent for art, he was enrolled at the "Escuela de Bellas Artes" and, seeing how quickly he learned, he was transferred to the Academia de Bellas Artes de San Fernando in Madrid, where he studied from 1857 to 1860 with Federico de Madrazo, Antonio María Esquivel and Juan Antonio Ribera.

Following his return to Granada, he found himself in economic difficulties. This was eased somewhat after winning prizes in 1861 and 1862 at events related to Corpus Christi festivities, organized by the city government of Granada, which resulted in several commissions.

In 1867, he obtained a position as a professor of drawing at the "Colegio de San Bartolomé y Santiago". He also taught classes at the "Escuela de Artes y Oficios del Asilo de San José" and, until 1888, he held the chair of decorative composition at the "Escuela de Bellas Artes". In the evenings, he gave private lessons for free.

Meanwhile, he continued to paint prolifically; creating scenes from the life of the bourgeoisie and Spanish history; winning a gold medal at the Exposición Granadina in 1876. Two years later, the provincial government awarded him a stipend to study in Rome, where he lived until 1880 with his wife and son. One of the works he painted there ("St.John of God saving the Sick from a Fire at the Royal Hospital") won second prize at the National Exhibition of Fine Arts in 1881.

Since he was a young boy, he was also interested in investigating the history of Granada. During excavations carried out in 1872, he discovered the first remains at Medina Elvira, an archaeological site in the Baetic Cordillera, which was probably the origination point for the Taifa of Granada, a medieval Berber kingdom.

In 1892, he began publishing the Guía de Granada, which has served as a model for subsequent guide books. He also published numerous historical studies in pamphlets and magazines; notably on Diego de Siloé, the Palace of Charles V, Alonso Cano, the paintings of the Alhambra and several monuments (he was a member of the Monument Commission).

His works and his advice were influential during the creation of the Archaeological Museum of Granada. In 1904, he was elected President of the "Patronato de la Alhambra y el Generalife", an organization devoted to historical preservation. He also served as President of the Royal Chapel of Granada. He died in Granada, aged 84.

== Selected paintings ==
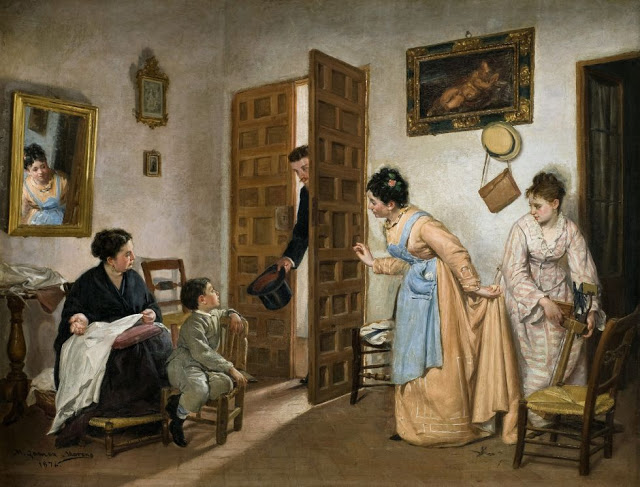
The Inopportune Visit 1875

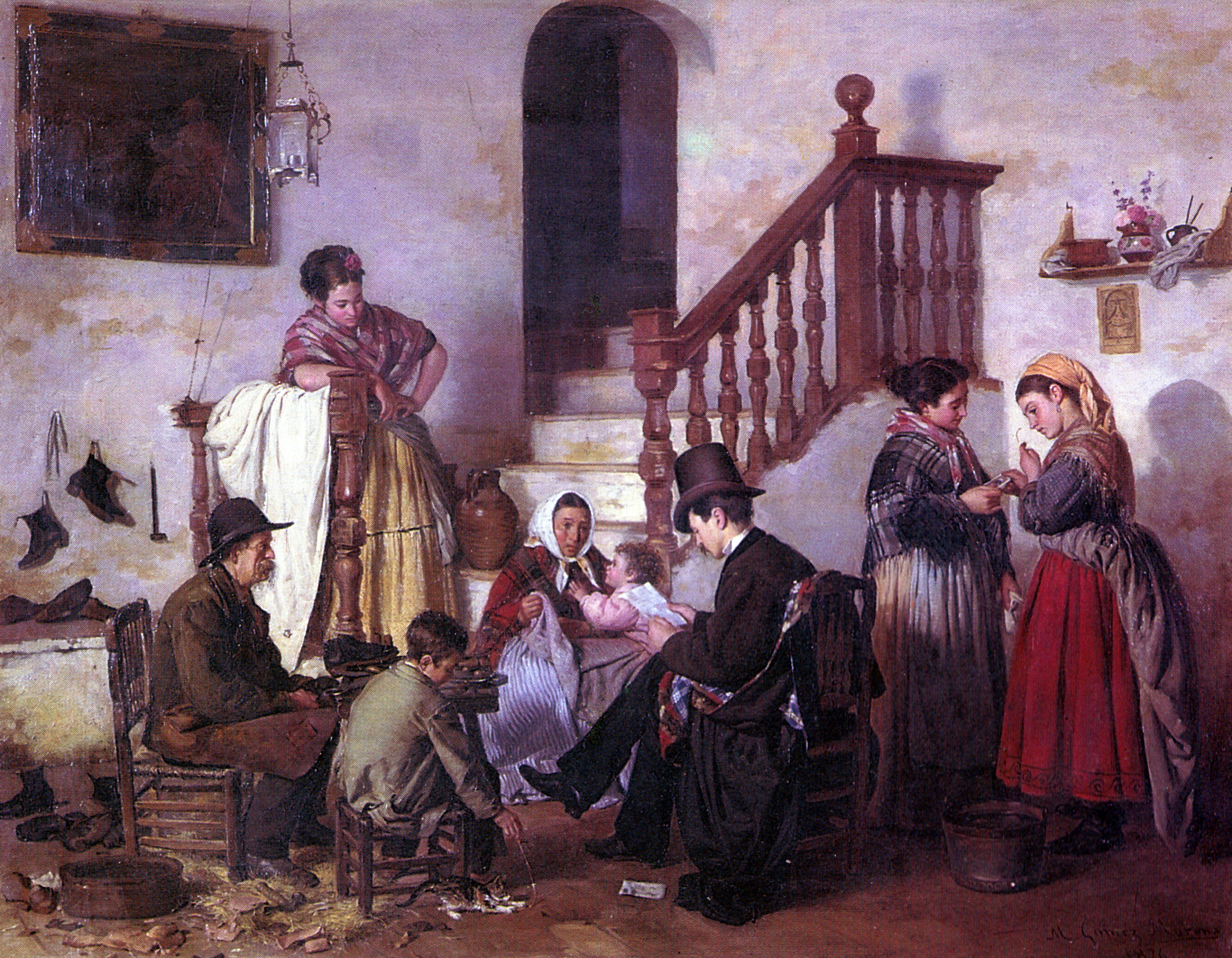
Reading the Letter c.1876

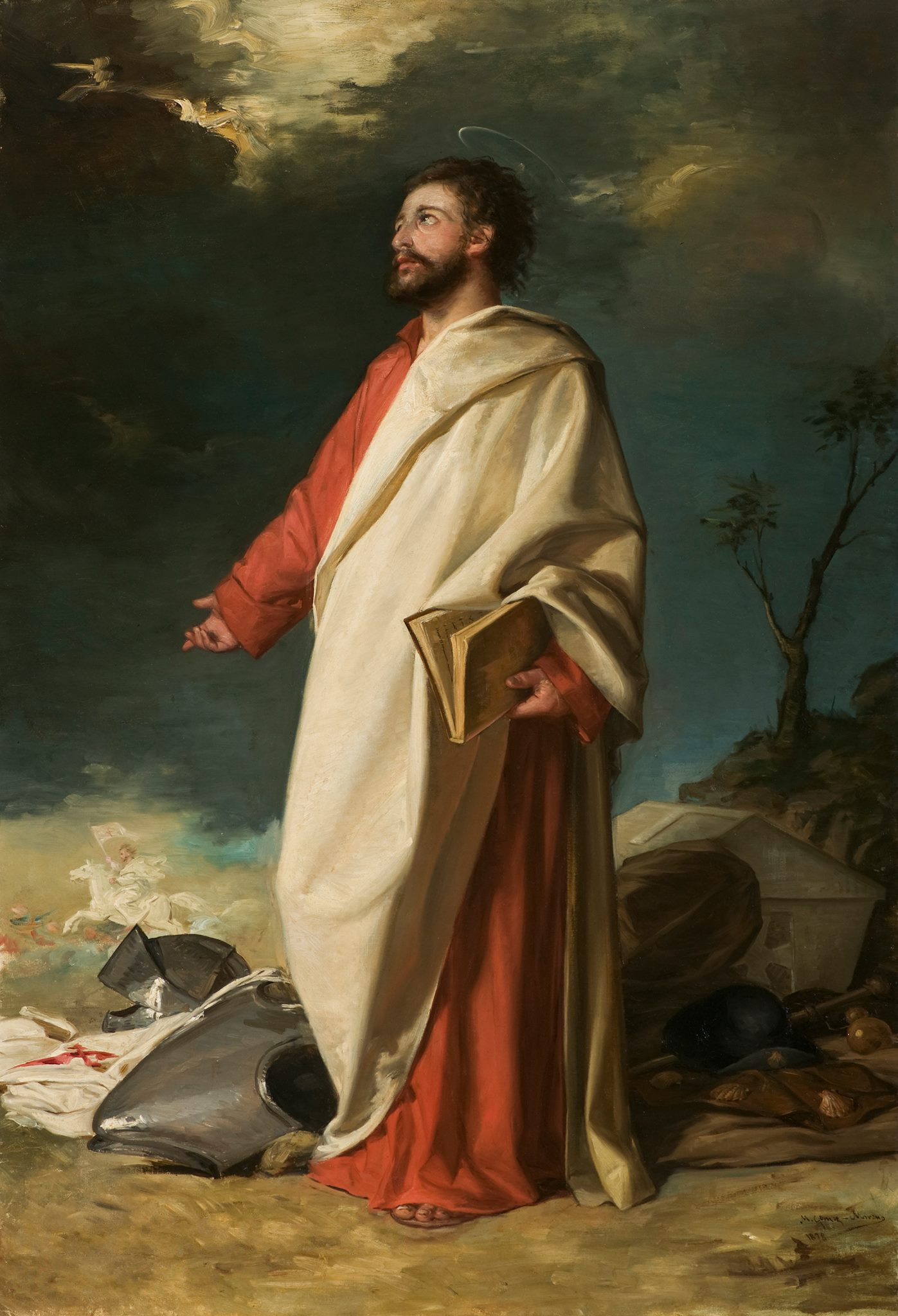
St. James, the Apostle 1878

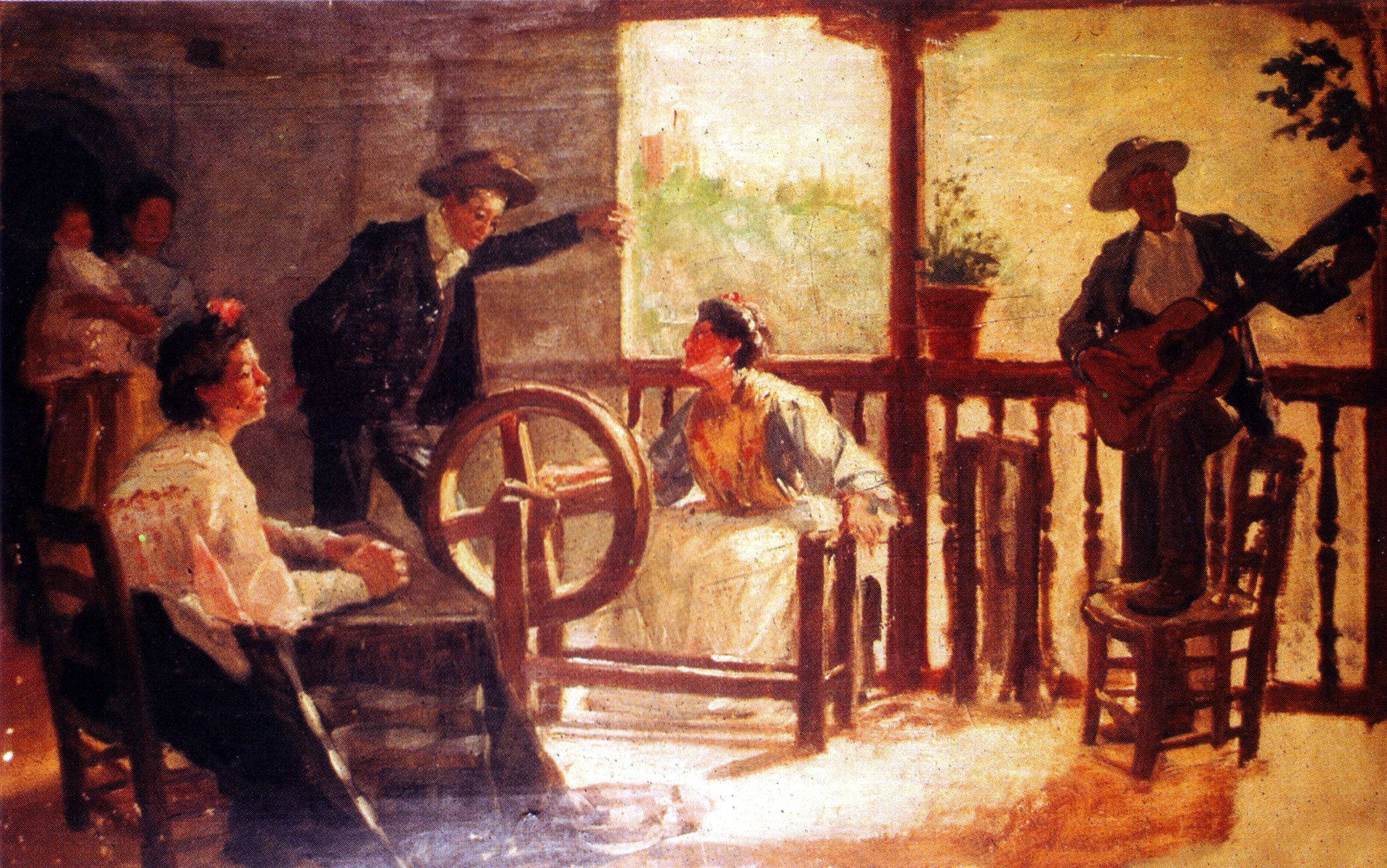
On the Terrace date unknown

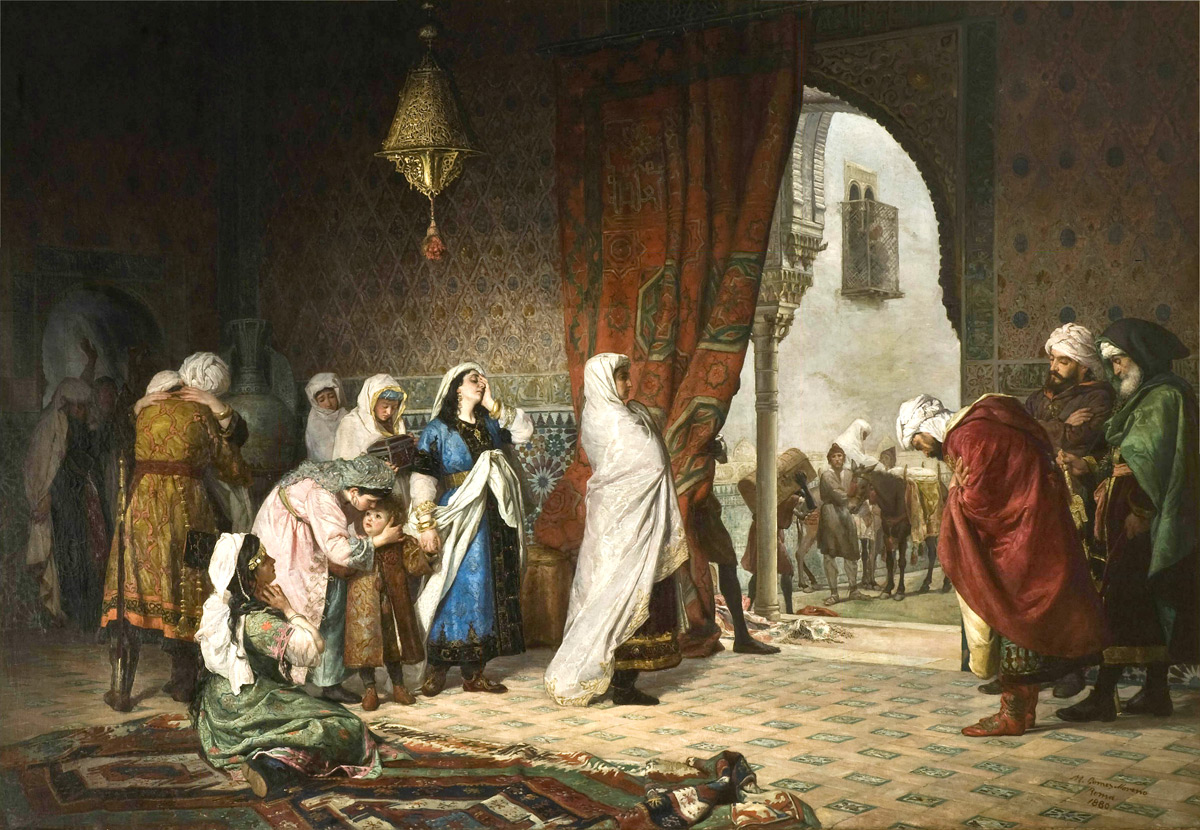
The Family of Boabdil leaving the Alhambra c.1880

== Publications ==
- Obra dispersa e inédita; compilación y estudio preliminar de Javier Moya Morales, Granada: Editorial Instituto Gómez-Moreno de la Fundación Rodríguez Acosta, 2004.
- Guía de Granada, 1892.
- Cosas granadinas de arte y arqueología, Granada [1916]
- Palacio del Emperador Carlos V en la Alhambra, Madrid: [s. n.], 1885
- Medina Elvira, Granada: Imp. La Lealtad, 1888; hay ed. moderna con estudio preliminar y cuidado de la edición por Manuel Barrios Aguilera, Granada: Grupo de Autores Unidos, 1986.
- Breves noticias sobre las moradas de algunos hombres ilustres en las ciencias, en las letras y en las artes, que han vivido en Granada, Granada: Paulino Ventura y Sabatel, 1870.
- Iglesias mozárabes: Arte español de los siglos IX a XI, Madrid: Centro de estudios históricos, 1919.
- Pinturas del Tocador de la Reina en la Casa Real de la Alhambra: apuntes, Granada. Imp. Indalecio Ventura, 1873
- Breve reseña de los monumentos y obras de arte que ha perdido Granada en lo que va de siglo,Granada: Imprenta de D. José López Guevara, 1884.
- Las pinturas de la Alhambra,
- Estudio sobre las sepulturas granadinas,
- Carácter de los monumentos granadinos
