= Manuel Gómez-Moreno Martínez =

Spanish archaeologist and historian (1870–1970)

The Most Excellent Manuel Gómez-Moreno
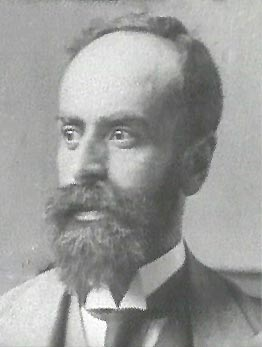
- (c.1915)
- Born: Manuel Gómez-Moreno Martínez; 21 February 1870; Granada, Spain
- Died: 7 June 1970 (aged 100); Madrid, Spain

Seat T of the Real Academia Española
- In office 28 June 1942 – 7 June 1970
- Preceded by: Isidro Gomá y Tomás (Note: Gomá was elected for the position in 1940 but never took the seat)
- Succeeded by: Carlos Clavería Lizana

Manuel Gómez-Moreno Martínez (21 February 1870 in Granada, Spain – 7 June 1970 in Madrid, Spain), was a Spanish archaeologist and historian.

== Biography ==
Martinez was born 21 February 1870 in Granada, Spain. He is the son of noted painter and amateur archaeologist, Manuel Gómez-Moreno González and Dolores Martínez Almirón.

He authored many books, nearly 300, mostly focused on Hispanic archeology and art history. During the first years of the twentieth century he wrote Catálogo Monumental y artístico de España (en: Monumental and Artistic Catalog of Spain). He also developed an interest in linguistics and in his 70s was made a member of the Royal Spanish Academy, which regulates the Spanish language.

Gómez-Moreno was named Doctor honoris causa by the universities of Montevideo and Oxford in 1941, Glasgow in 1951 and Granada in 1970. One of his students was Hispanic art historian, José María de Azcárate. He died in 1970 at the age of 100.

== See also ==
- San Pedro de la Nave
