= Pedagogical Centre of Xàtiva =

The Pedagogical Centre of Xàtiva, or Teacher's House (Valencian: Casa de l'Ensenyança; Spanish: Casa de la Enseñanza) is a museum in Xàtiva, Valencia (Spain). It was built in 1758 by order of Archbishop Andres Mayoral Alonso de Mella to educate poor children, just as he had done in the city of Valencia. It is the work of Father José Alberto Pina, Carmelite friar who served as city architect and worked well in the work of the Cathedral.

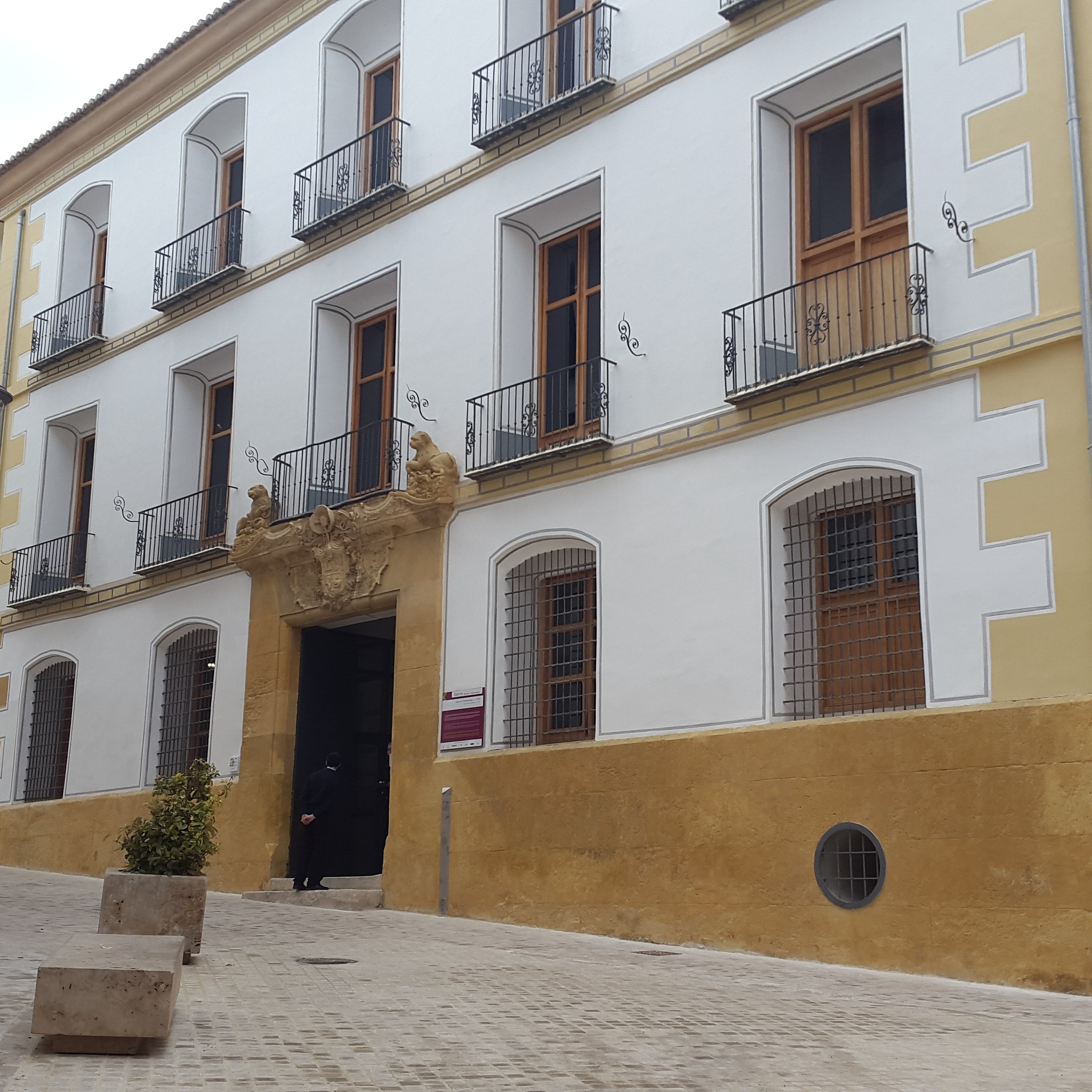
Front of the House Education

It was built along the lines of classical style, with trapezoidal three facades which include elements such as wrought iron balconies and the shield of the archbishop of the main entrance. The interior is developed around an internal courtyard with arches and communicates via a staircase decorated with ceramics. It was for many years secondary school in the city.

== History ==
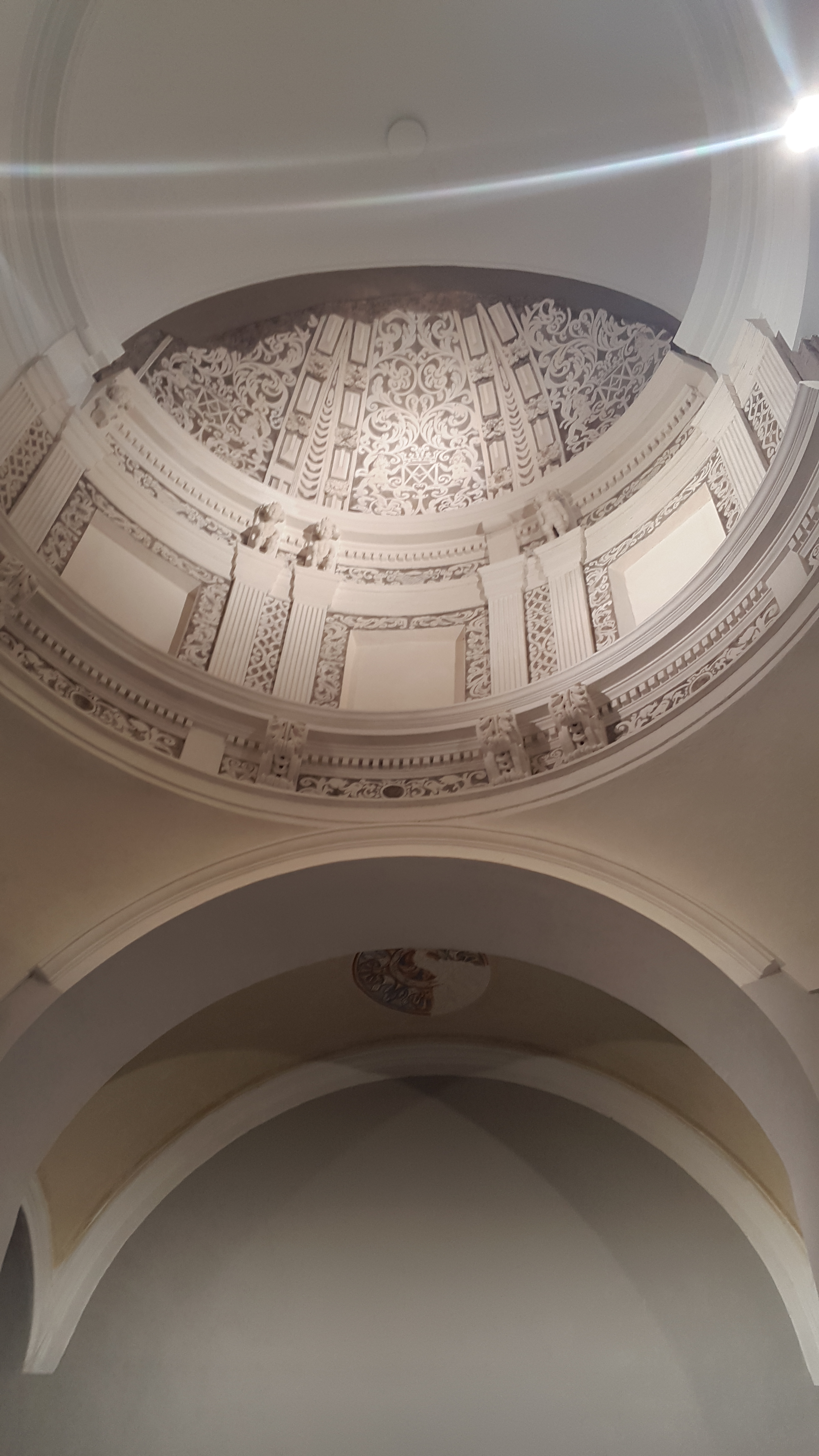
Dome of the House Education

The archbishop of Valencia D. Andres Mayoral, anticipating the demands of modern life and culture, all understood the importance of the problem of Christian education in childhood, who devoted his initiative and as their economic resources. For this reason it had to create the foundation of similar establishments in two identical organization and its purpose. On the one hand cover the costs of their care and food in the School of the wealthy classes, as well as help those humble class to study.
For these reasons mentioned is for creating the School Andress. The downstairs dedicated to the public school children. The other establishment dedicated to the teachings of the girls. The second floor was allocated to education and recollliment maidens of distinguished birth and main floors and low for the education of poor children free. In this he was appointed House Education and gave her a thorough regulatory regime, trusting their leadership to Superior and teaching some teachers were rewarded with 1 or 2 pounds a month. These teachers had a life almost monastic vows of chastity and pronouncing obedència.
To perform these foundations requested royal license to purchase land and amortize them exactly the amount of assets and income sufficient to support those forms tailored strictly to the law to cease assured that their permanence and perpetuity. He also asked to add to the amortization of these assets was bequeathed this purpose Dr. Joseph D. Moreno, obtaining all thanks to the Royal Provisions 1759.
Following this first Royal Provision began to build the house building for general education and free. He began to give this service in the following year 1762.
Immediately after the death of Archbishop Mayoral, confiscated all property constituting their foundations by the Court repository, since the House Education had an independent life, running his free goods that a director appointed General Colector the repository.

== Remodeling ==
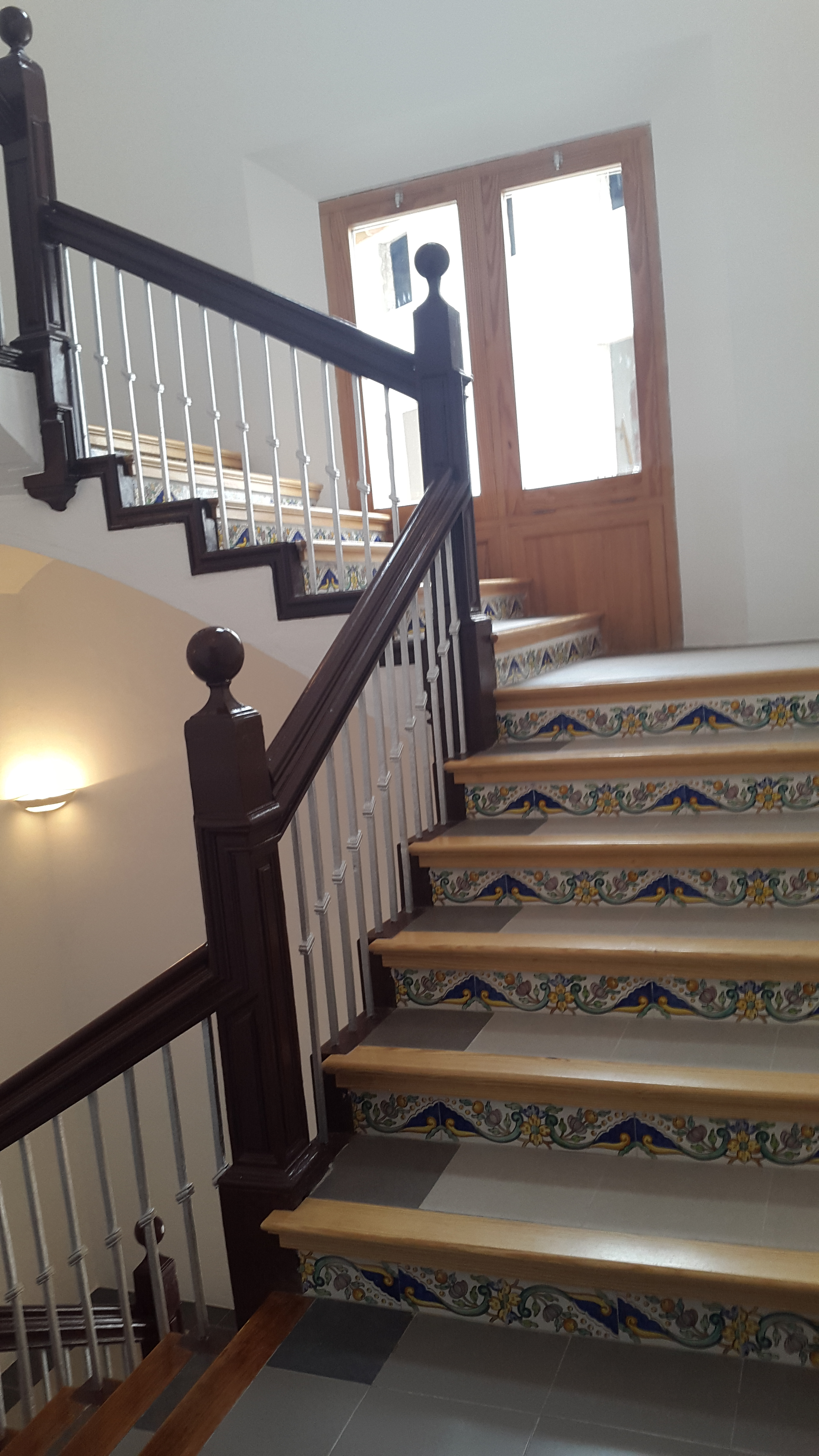
Stairs restored House of Education

Entering the 90s, it was not until 1991 under the direction of Mariano González Baldoví when projected in the House of teaching the location of the Museum of Fine Arts in the city of Xativa.
From this moment the House Education and closes its doors this way begins to sink into oblivion, decay and darkness until the twenty-first century. is at this time when the city of Xativa opens new doors and begin excavations and restoration of the existing building and the building of a continuous contrucció new plant.

It was from this point that the projection of a Museum of Fine Arts in the city of Xativa to life. The starting point of a journey that has lasted more than 7 years and where he had to bring the building into a museum. An arduous task that culminated with the transfer and placement of each of the pieces of history and culture, a fact that has not done pugut start until March 2014.

== Architecture ==
The building of the House of Education consists of ground floor and two floors, leaving the north and together with the front door in a tower inside the stairwell that articulated the building of the former parish Santa Tecla in order to attend religious services without leaving the street. The interior is developed from a courtyard that connects the lobby and garage through large arches lights.

The façade is completely symmetrical with wrought iron balconies 5 per plant. Opening the door holds the shield of Archbishop Mayoral between rocks and lions.

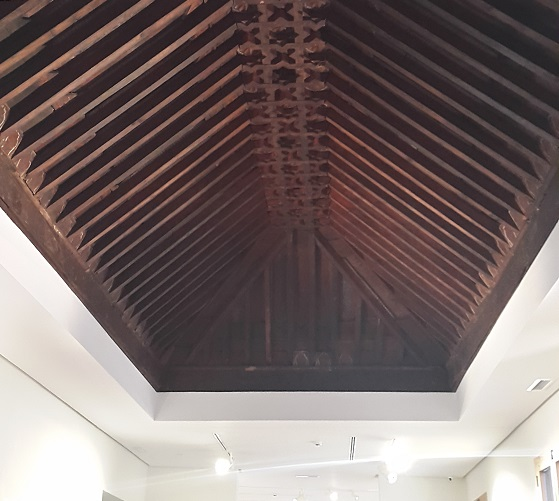
Almizate from Beautiful Pine Palace

The main body of the building has three floors and a tower, located right on the Latera stairwell. The left wing, which oblique disposition with respect to the central body is bound by the road network consists of the same number of plants.

The right wing has four floors ue is detached, and even built on the foothills of the former Church of Santa Tecla, and especially interesting are the remains of the cornice, and drum shells, the chapel of the Virgin God of Health, which are still standing at the end of the wing attached.

In the courtyard are two segmental arches bearing runners, certainly after the rest of the factory, organized movement in plants, clarifying the main body and the bottom of this task.

In a room of the museum you can see the ceiling paneling and a skirt with almizate restaurant, from the Pino Hermoso's Palace.

== Painting ==
=== Pop art ===
Pop art is a style typical of the 1960 and 1970s. It developed in the United States and soon went on to Western Europe. The House of Education, currently the Museum of Fine Arts, has a room with paintings typical of this style. Highlights a picture of the School of Paris with the characteristic Picasso and Van Gogh.

=== Spanish Painters ===
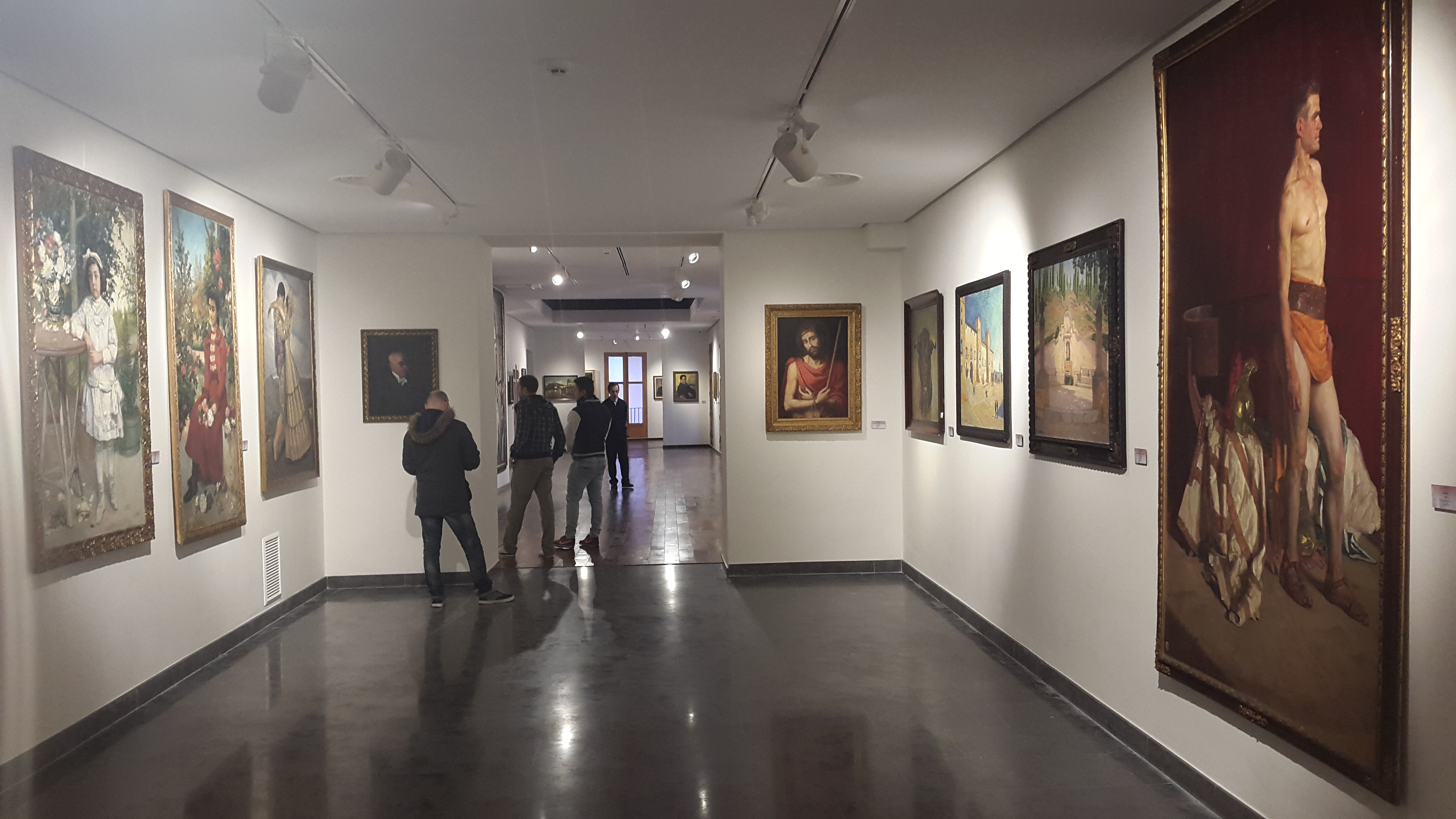
Room of the museum dedicated to Spanish painters

In the museum there is a special room dedicated to artists born in Spain, such as:

- Rusiñol
- José Soto Guner
- José Benlliure Gil
- José Gutiérrez Solana
- Joaquin Tudela
- Juan Francés
- José García Tortosa "El vernia"
- José Martínez Estruch
- Rafael Perales Tortosa
- Vicente Santaolaria, among others.

In this room include portraits created by Vicente Castillo, in the famous Sarthou family, and a painting of Vicente Giner Sorolla.

=== Portraits of Bourbon kings ===
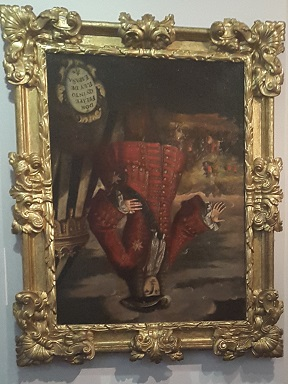
Portrait of Philip V upside down

In this room are portraits of the eighteenth and nineteenth centuries of Bourbon kings, such as:

- Gabriela Maria Luisa of Savoy
- Louis I
- Carlos III
- Charles IV
- Fernando VII
- Maria Luisa of Parma
- Alfonso XII
- Isabella II

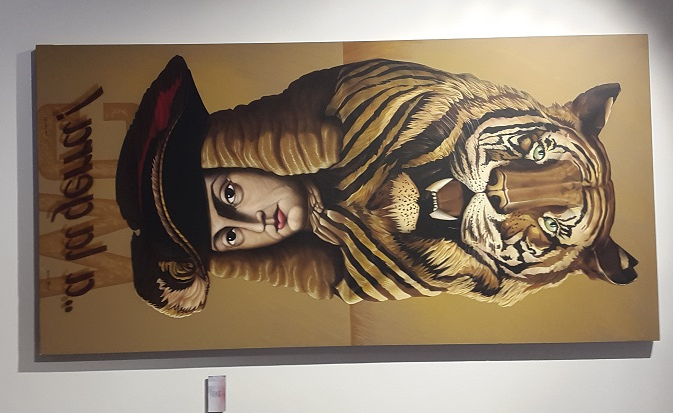
Works of Antoni Miró

In this room hangs the portrait of Philip V, which is hung upside down because in 1940, the museum curator D. Carlos Sarthou put it in this position, in symbolic revenge for the monarch having ordered the burning and destruction of Xativa in the War of Spanish Succession. Since then it has remained in this position.

Following the upside down portrait of Philip V, one can find the work of Antoni Miró 1989.

== Prints ==
It is known as recorded in the printing technique or art that involves a previous work on a surface which is then covered with the ink which is obtained by pressing different copies of the same model.
In the museum there is a room dedicated to this technique, which has digital devices to observe the whole process of realization of engraving, and which include collections of Goya and Jacques Callot .

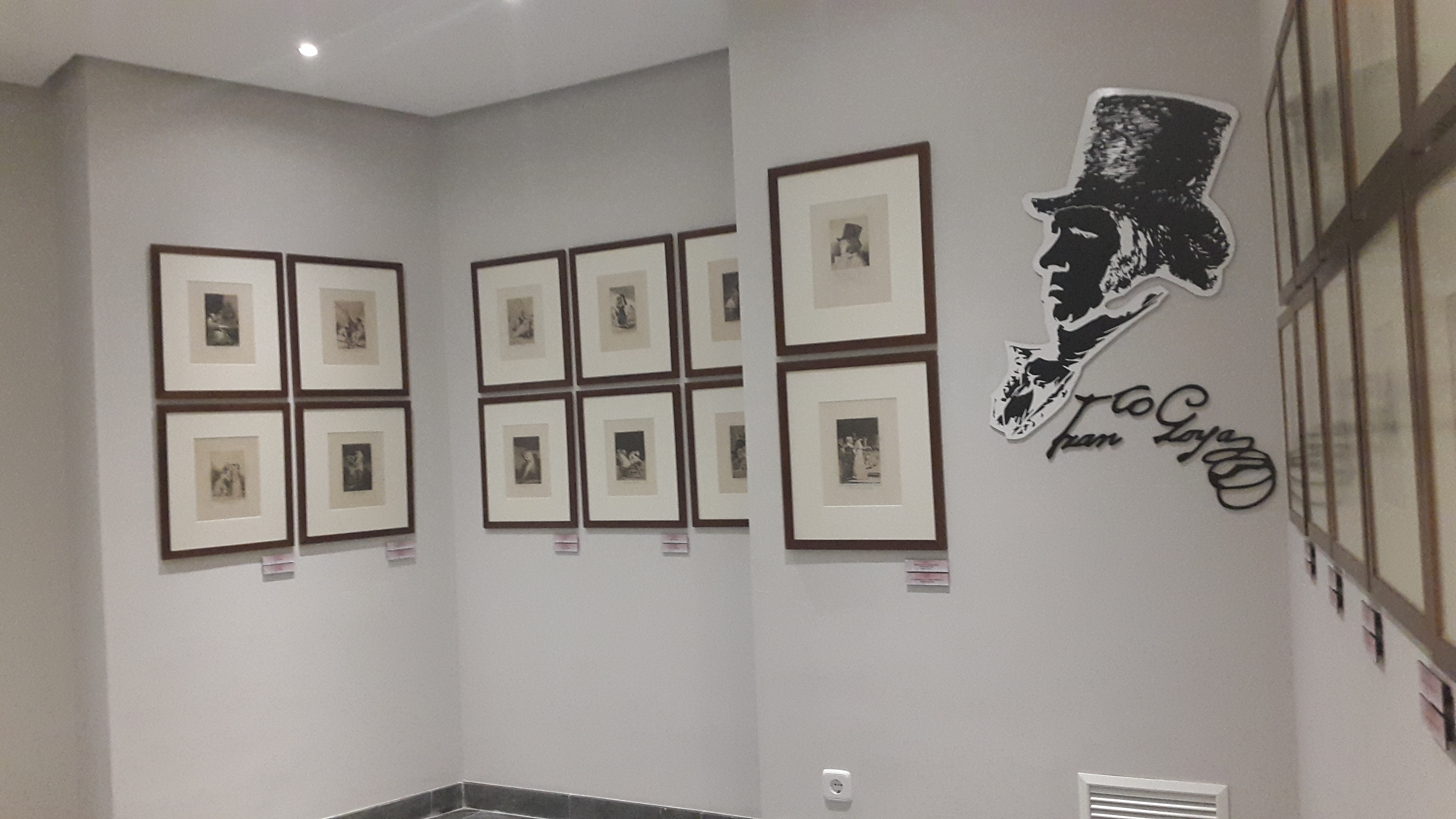
Prints Goya

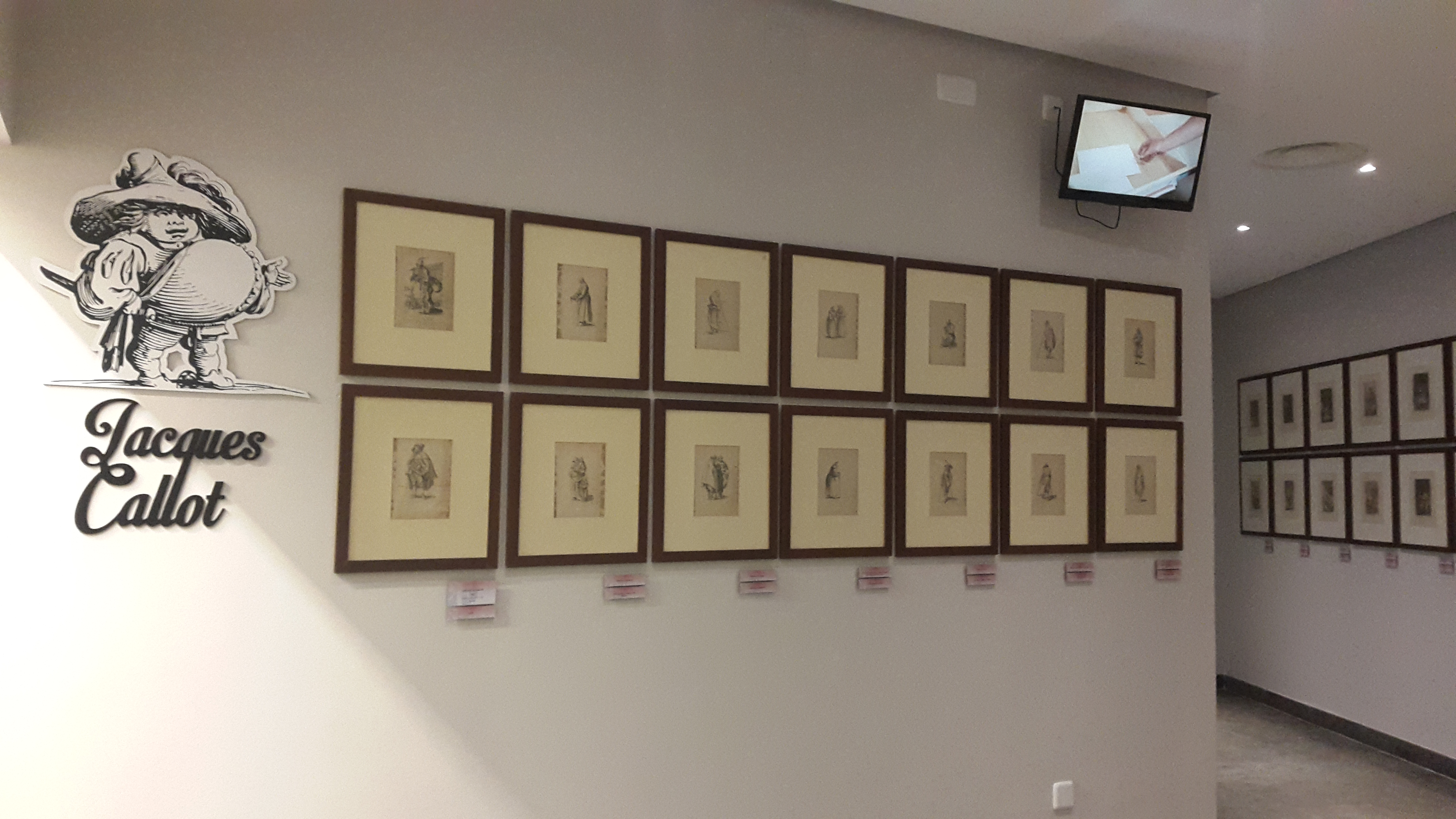
Prints of Jacques Callot

== Llaudes Fund Family ==
In the museum there is a room dedicated to the Llaudes family, where you can find paintings and objects belonging to this family, the museum acquired through auction.

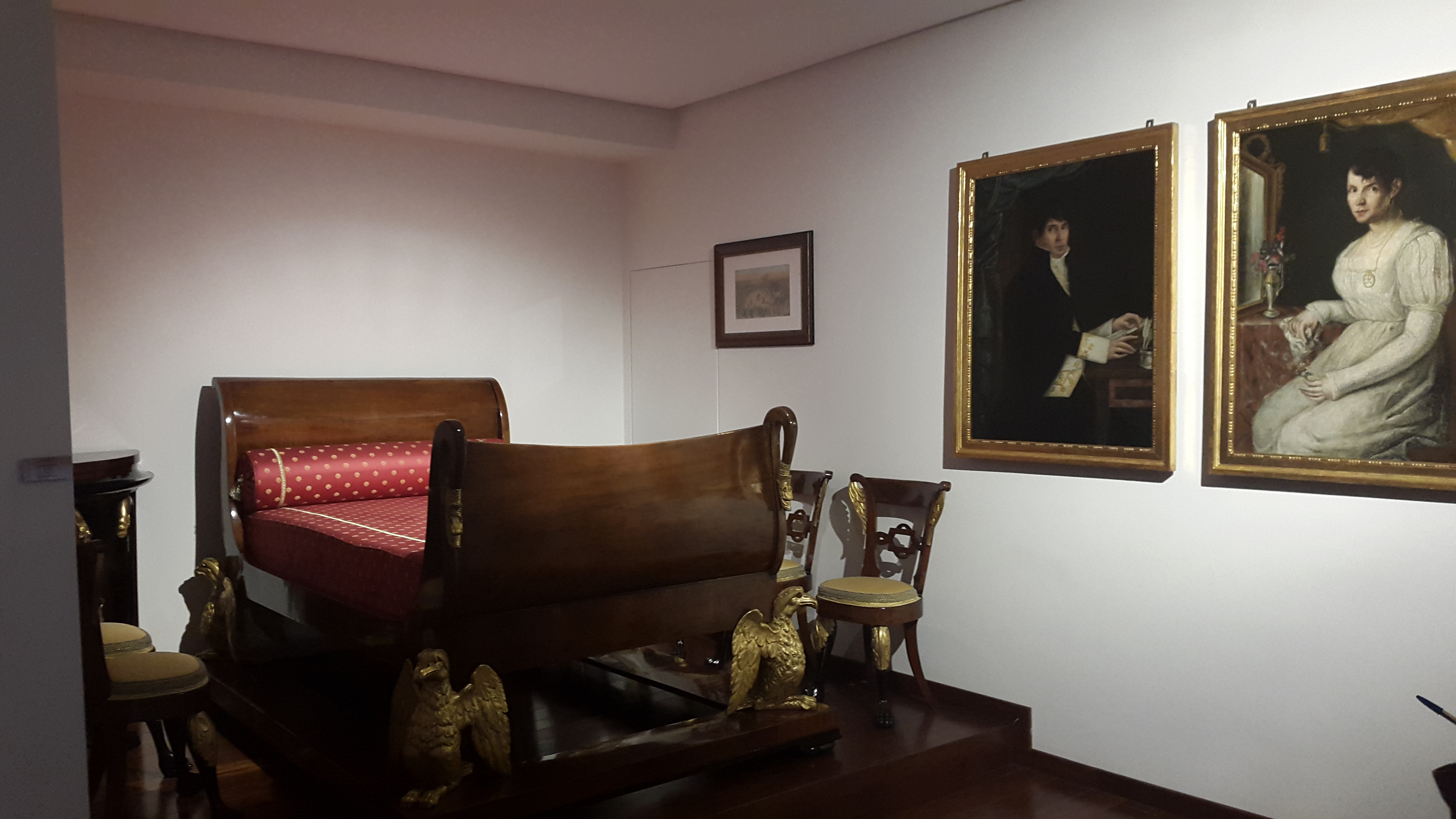
Family Fund Llaudes museum
