= José Benlliure y Gil =

Spanish painter (1858–1937)

José Benlliure
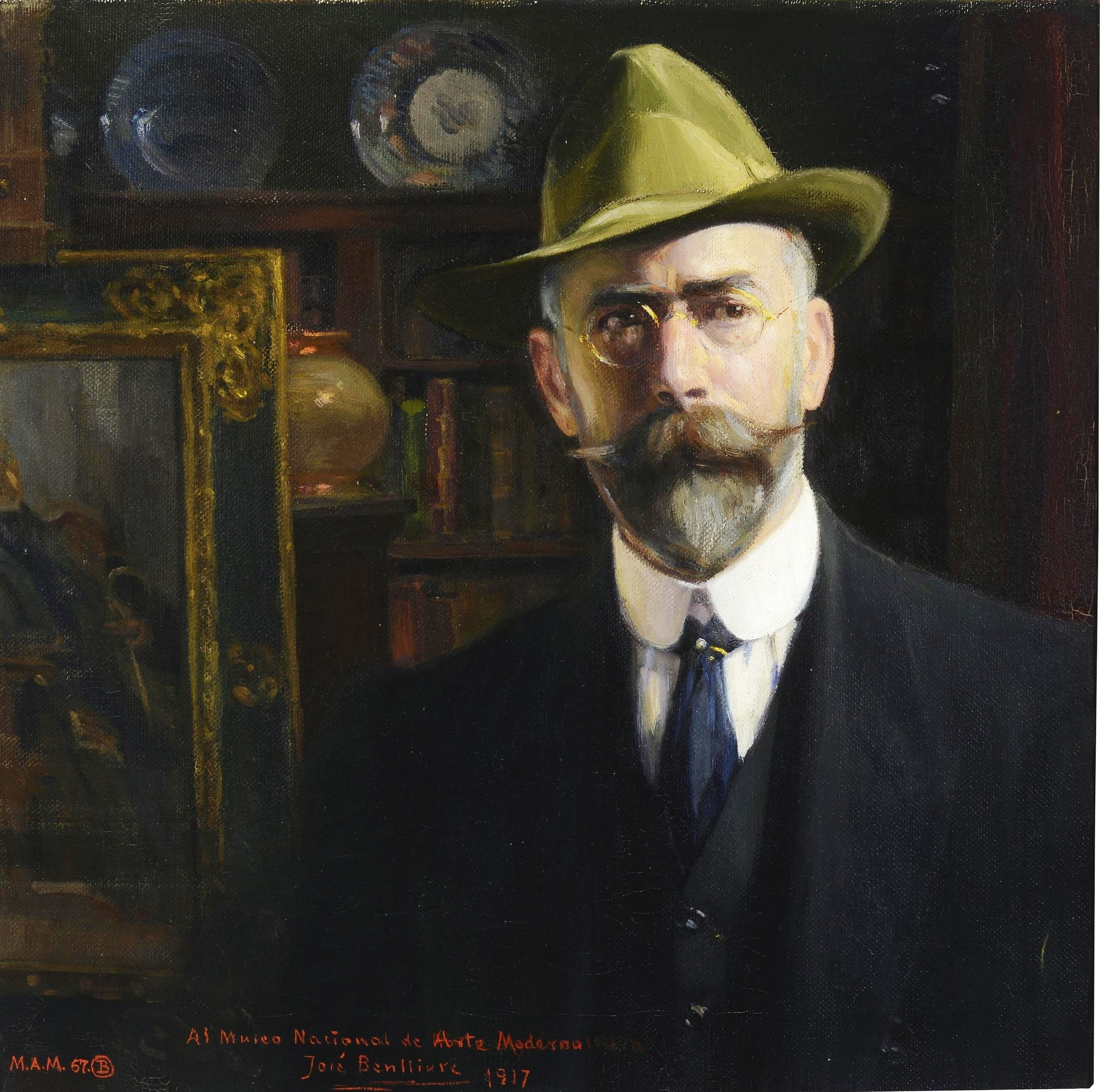
- Self-portrait, 1917
- Born: José Benlliure y Gil; 1 October 1855; Cañamelar, Spain
- Died: 5 April 1937 (aged 81); Valencia, Spain
- Resting place: Valencia

José Benlliure y Gil (1 October 1855, Cañamelar – 5 April 1937, Valencia) was a Spanish painter.

== Life ==
He was born on 1 October 1855 in the municipality of Cañamelar, currently a part of the city of Valencia.

He studied painting under Francisco Domingo Marqués, and showed from the first such marked talent that he was sent to the Spanish Academy in Rome. From 1903 to 1913, he was director of the Spanish Academy of Fine Arts. He was one of the select circle pensioned by the Spanish government for residence in Italy and executed several state orders for the decoration of public buildings; but he owes his chief fame to his large historical paintings, notably the "Vision in the Coliseum." He became the leader of the Spanish art colony in Rome, where he practised as painter and sculptor.

He married Maria Ortiz in 1880, after establishing his residence in Rome. In Italy he painted small genre paintings, and began in the city of Assisi on the View of the Coliseum (now in the Museum of Fine Arts in Valencia), a painting he won a first prize in the National exhibition of 1887, together with his brother, the sculptor Mariano Benlliure, who presented the award-winning sculpture of the painter Jusepe de Ribera.

Benlliure obtained several successes in Paris, Munich, Stuttgart and Berlin with his paintings. In 1903 he assumed leadership of the Spanish Academy in Rome, succeeding his brother Mariano, a position he would keep for ten years. In late 1919 he offered a tribute to Rome with an exhibition of 45 paintings in Madrid in the halls of the Royal Theatre. When he returned to Valencia he was appointed as honorary president of the Circle of Fine Arts in Valencia, and became director of the local Museum of Fine Arts, a position he held until 1924. He received the Grand Cross of the Crown of Italy and the Cross of Officer of the Legion of Honour from the French government.

He died in Valencia on April 5, 1937.

== Family ==
José Benlliure y Gil's brothers Juan Antonio and Mariano were also a painter and a sculptor, respectively.

He was also the father of painter José Benlliure y Ortiz, known as Peppino, who was born in Rome in 1884.

In 1957, the painter's daughter, María Benlliure Ortiz gave the City of Valencia, the family house where her father and his family lived and worked, along with a number of his paintings, his son's paintings family photographs, and paintings by Muñoz Degrain, Rusinñol, family friend Joaquin Sorolla, and others. The museum also provides access to the house's garden and a studio that Benlliure y Gil had created for his son José, who died in 1916. The painter's wife, María Ortiz Fullana died in 1918. The museum, House Museum Benlliure, is operated by the city of Valencia as a public museum.

== Gallery ==
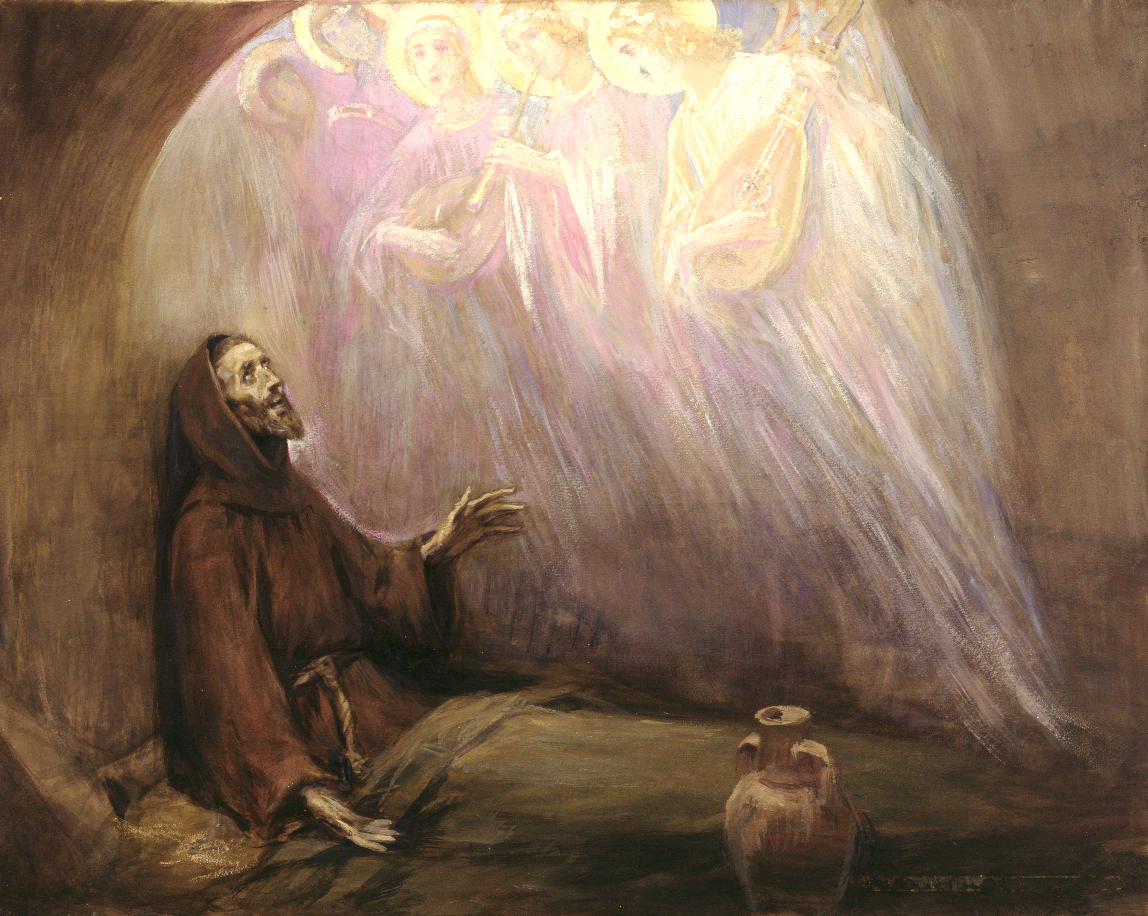
Life of Francis of Assisi by Josep Benlliure Gil

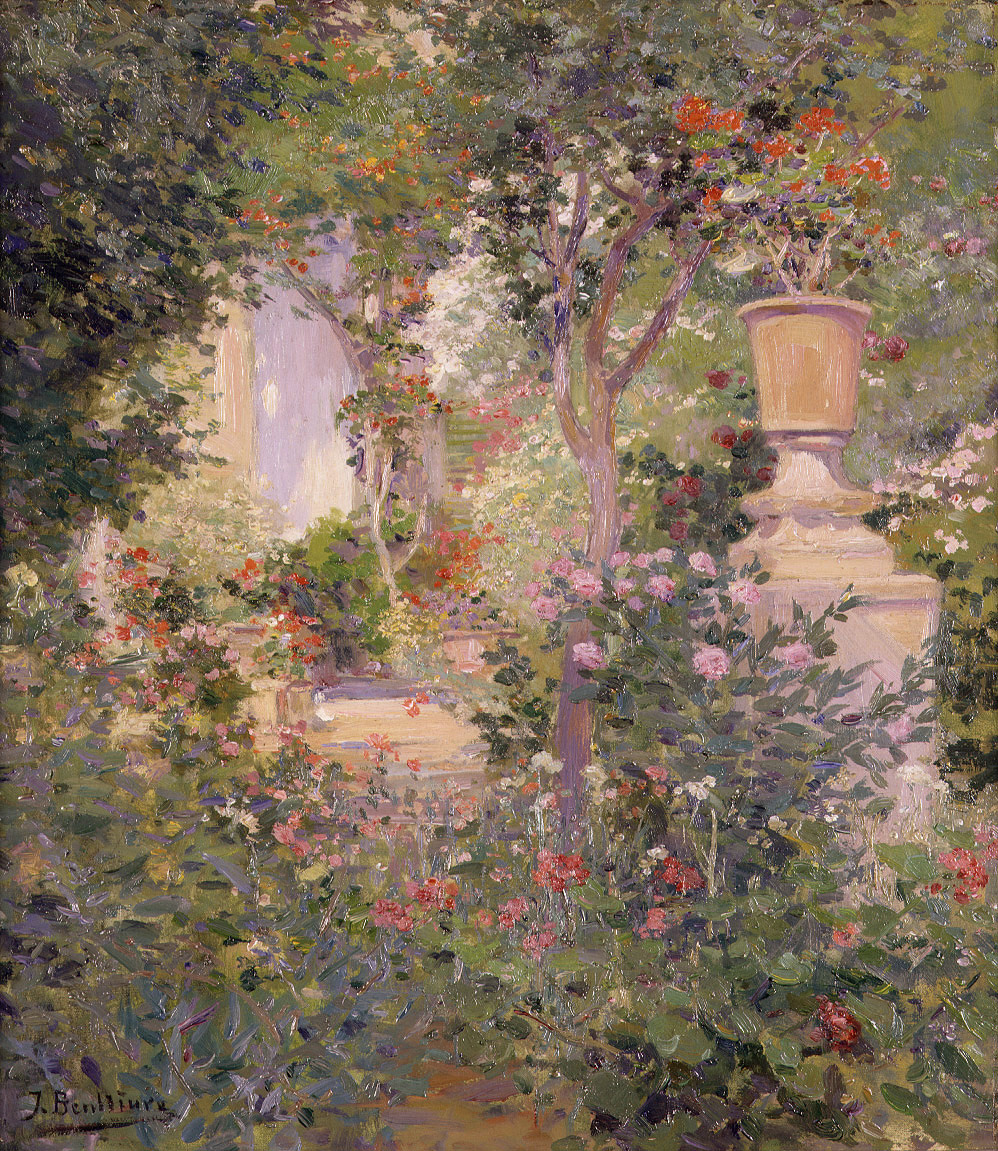
The painter's garden

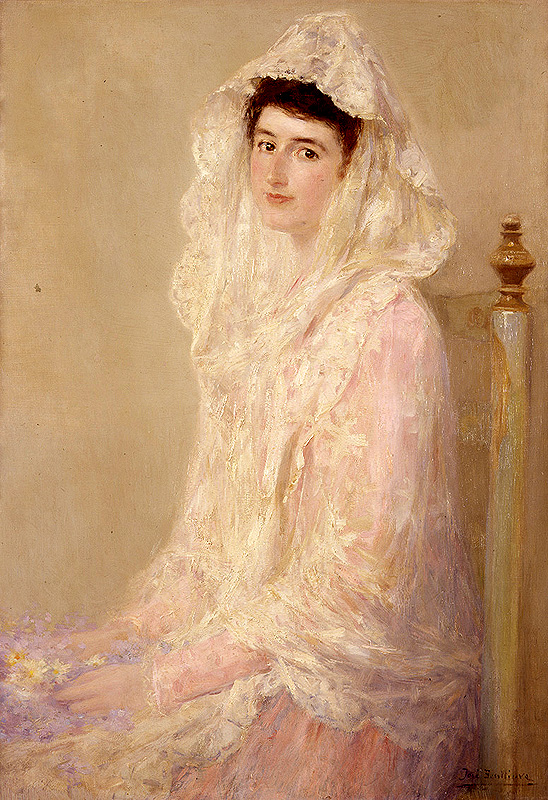
Maria Benlliure Ortiz, 1905

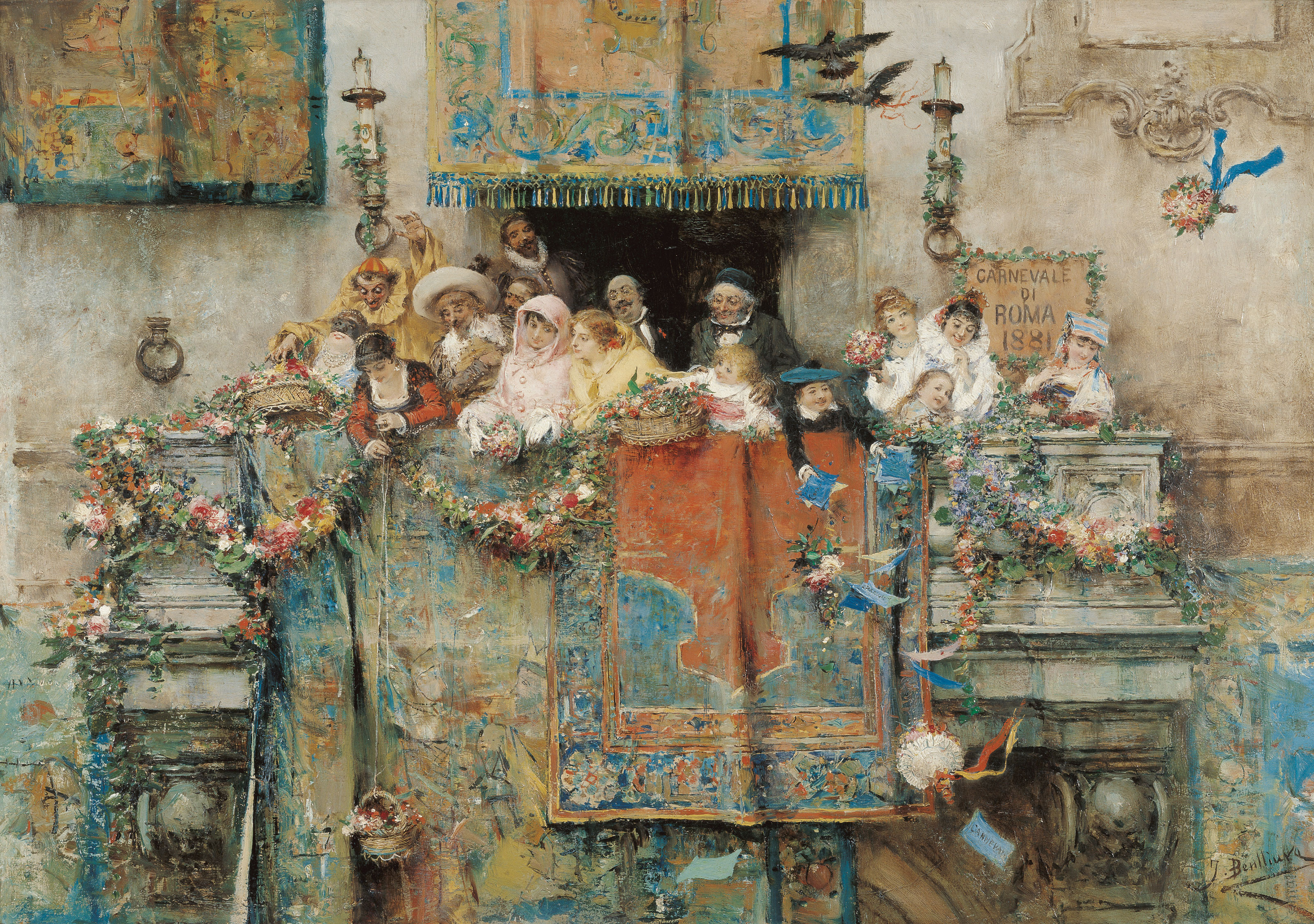
The Carnival in Rome 1881

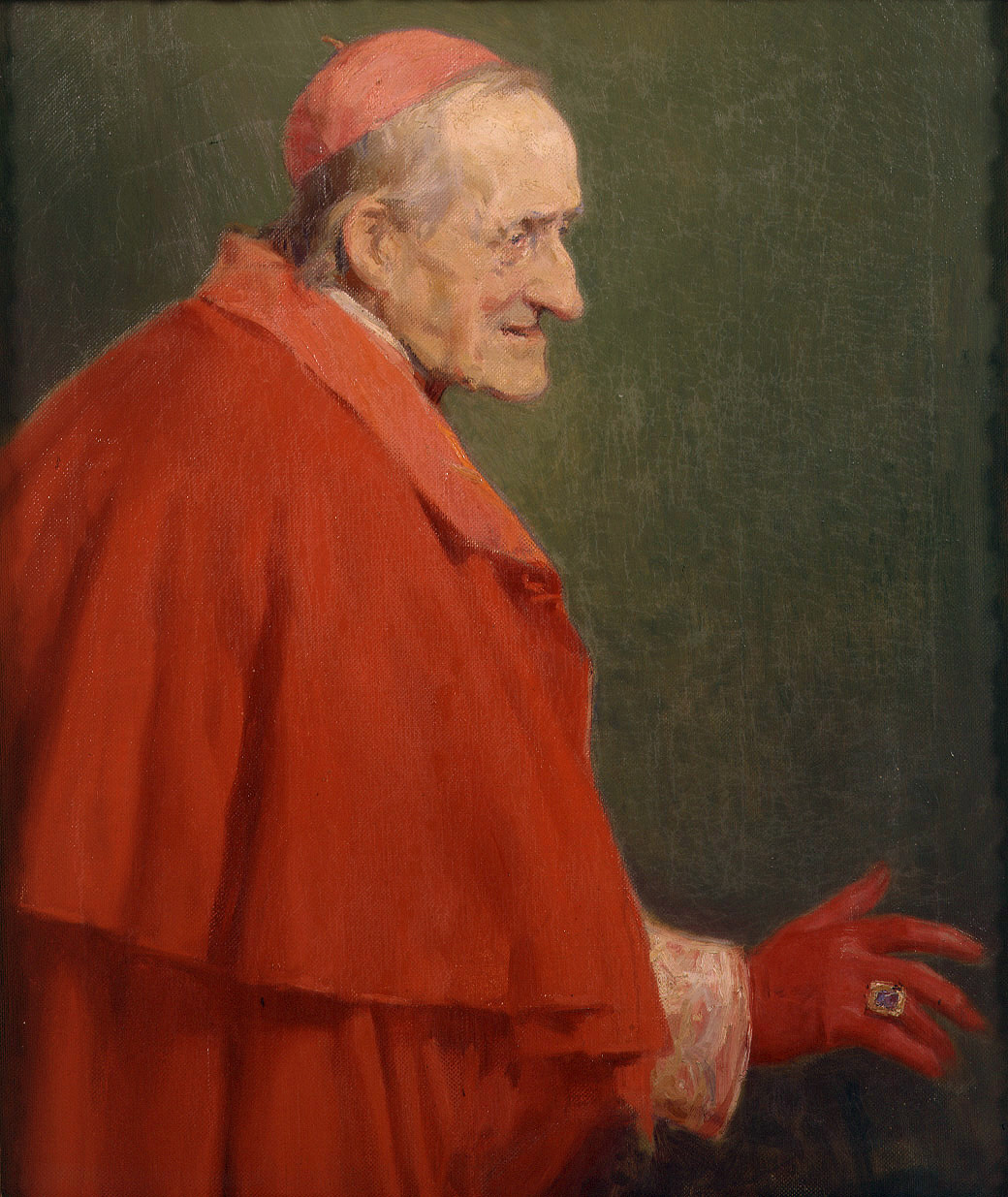
Cardinal

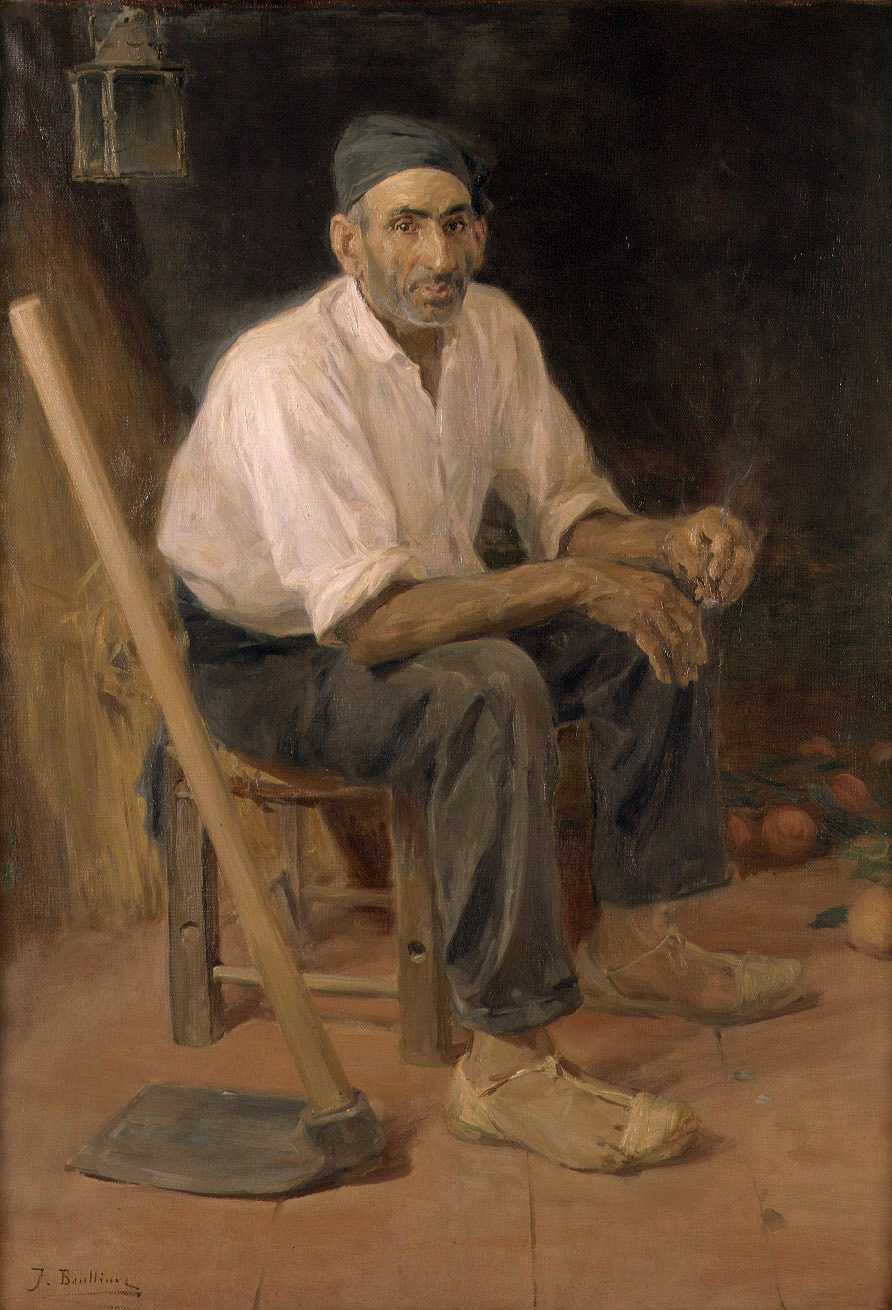
Uncle Andreu de Rocafort, José Benlliure, Museum of Fine Arts in Valencia

== Bibliography ==
- Gaya Nuño, Juan Antonio (1968). Historia y guía de los museos de España (in Spanish). Espasa-Calpe.
- González López, Carlos; Martí, Montserrat (1989). Historia y guía de los museos de España (in Spanish). Tusquets.
- Martínez Ortiz, José (1964). Cartas a Mariano Benlliure (in Spanish). Ayuntamiento de Valencia.
