= El Cabanyal =

Neighbourhood in Valencia, Spain

Coordinates: 39°28′08″N 0°19′58″W

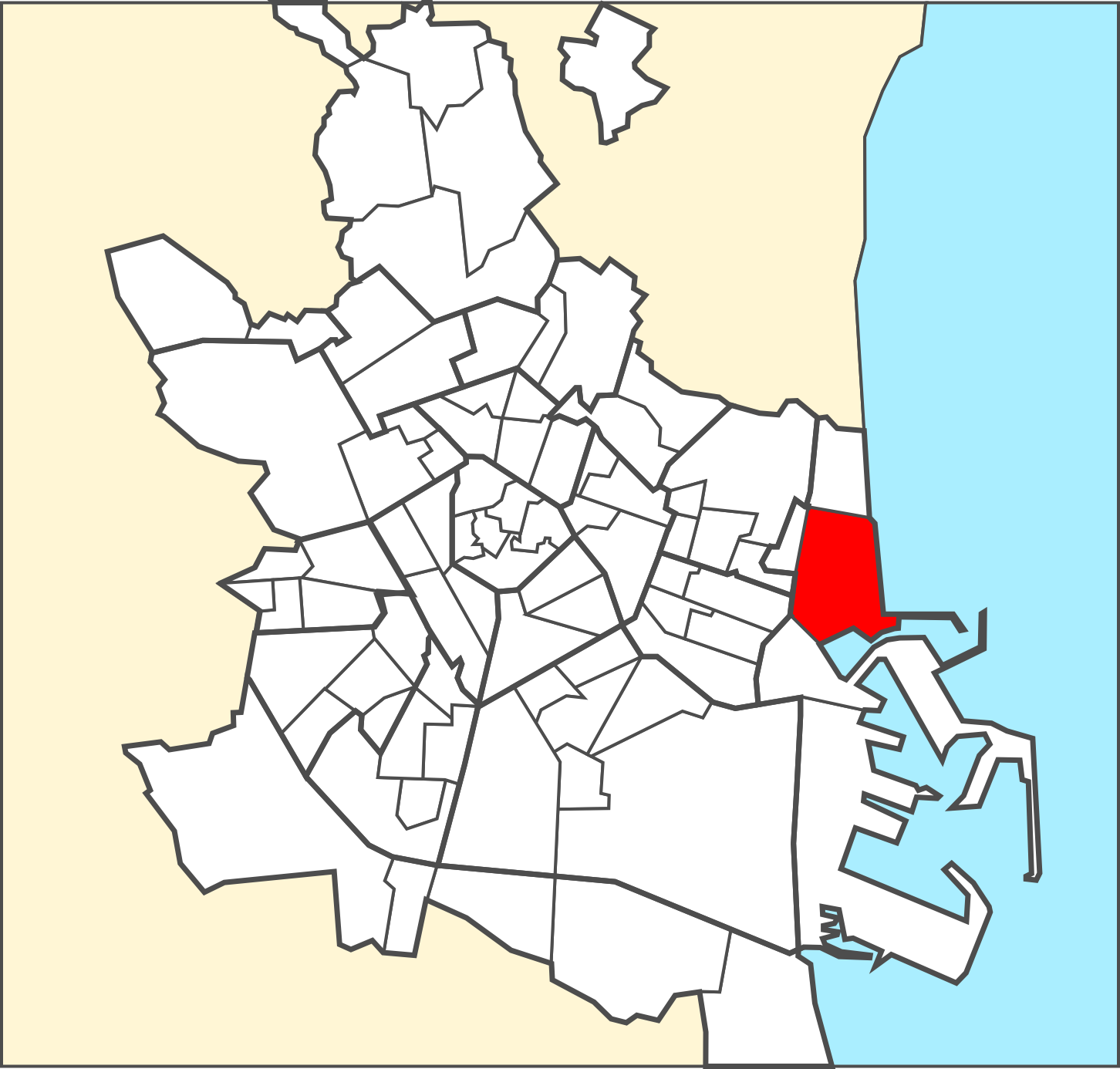
location of the neighborhood in Valencia

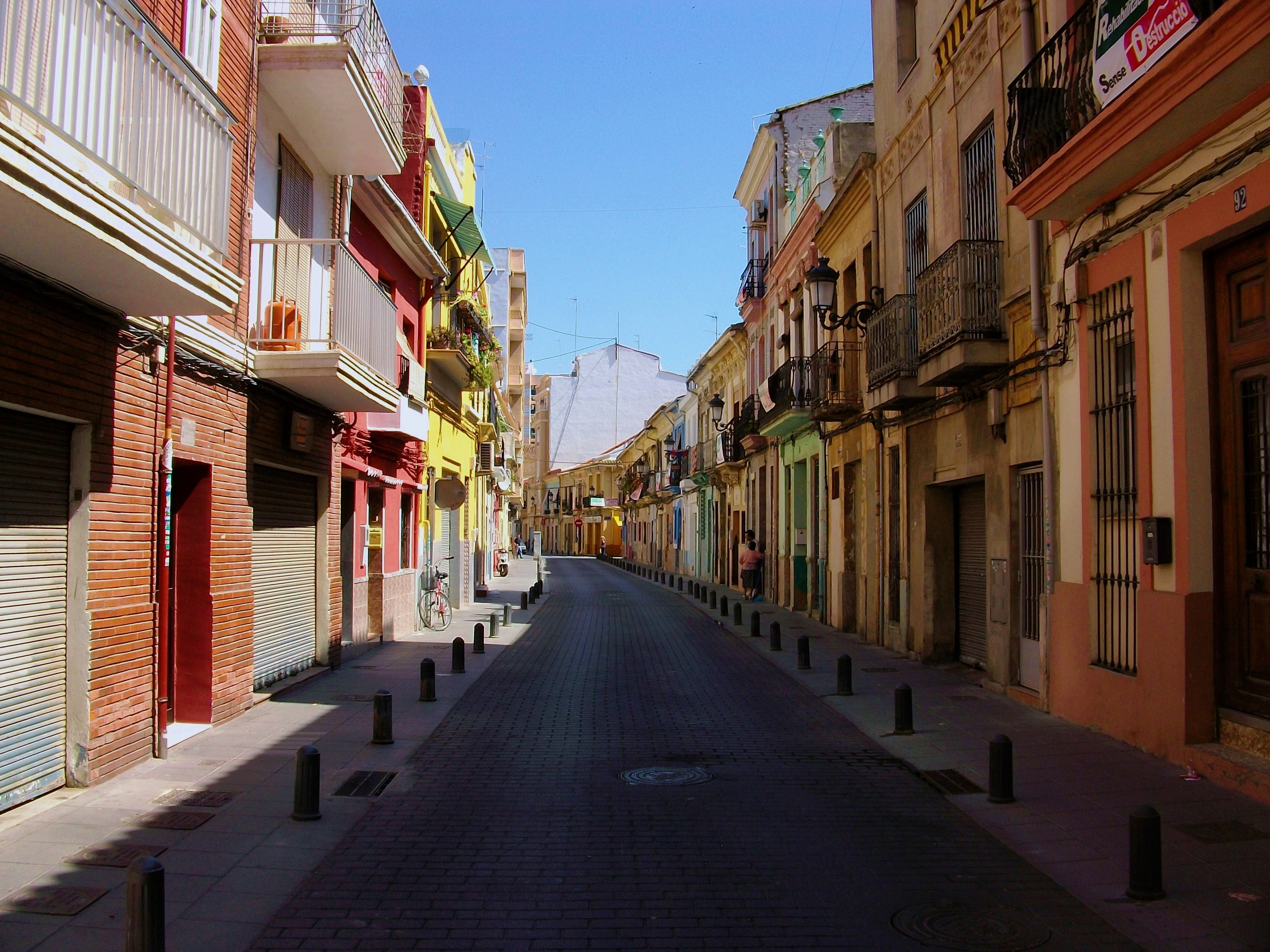
Rosari Street

El Cabanyal (Cabanyal-Canyamelar) is a neighbourhood in the city of Valencia which is part of the sea village. It is located in the eastern part of the city, very near to La Malvarrosa, Valencia's main beach.

In 2020, The Guardian classes El Cabanyal as the third coolest neighbourhood in Europe.

== Remodeling ==
On 24 July 1998, the local government of Rita Barberà, of the conservative People's Party approved a plan for extending the Blasco Ibáñez avenue to the sea. The plan implied the destruction of 1,651 houses all located in the whole neighbourhood. The old fishing enclave of Cabanyal-Canyamelar, which was and is very deteriorated, is also considered a Heritage site of Cultural Interest, so the plan could not be applied and the struggle between the Town Hall and the neighbours fighting against the destruction of their home led to a social fracture that has continued since then.

The main organization against Barberà's plans, Salvem el Cabanyal (Save Cabanyal, in Valencian) worked as civic resistance and won some tactical victories at the courts. The Mayor of Valencia, Rita Barberà, even disqualified them by arguing that they were "violent", because "they summit judicial appeals".

The strategy of the local council for taking the demolition ahead consisted of creating some public corporations (as "AUMSA" or "Cabanyal 2010"), which bought 500 of the houses in the area to be demolished, after pressuring the owners to sell their homes at low prices. During the 2000 decade those houses were abandoned, with drug-dealers occupying them.

In 2007, Barberà's government sent expropriation letters to all neighbours in Sant Pere street, the main artery in the affected area. Meanwhile, Las Provincias newspaper started a campaign against the citizens organized under "Salvem", damaging the cohabitation in the neighbourhood.

Despite the fact that law courts did not allow Barbera's plan in a protected area, the People's Party used their majorities in both the local council and the regional government to modify laws in a sense that could allow the demolition. In April 2010, Rita Barberà approved, by decree, the demolition of the houses affected by the plan. Civic actions prevented the action of the bulldozers and finally the courts prevented the action. Despite this, about 125 houses were demolished, 28 of which were tiled in the very specific way Cabanyal houses are tiled. In 2013, the conflict in Cabanyal was still ongoing. That year, 272 tiled houses were catalogued, with 139 of those protected and 43 marked to be demolished by the expansion plan.

After Barberà's team lost the local elections in 2015, the new left-leaning local council with the mayor Joan Ribó paralyzed the plans of demolition and prolongation of the avenue Blasco Ibáñez. Instead, the local council has the revitalization of the Cabanyal district as one of its main flags, through the rehabilitation and increase of public services in the neighborhood.
