= Lesmes =

Lesmes is a surname. Notable people with the surname include:

- Aurelio García Lesmes (1884–1942), Spanish landscape painter
- Carlos Lesmes (born 1958), Spanish judge and prosecutor
- Francisco Lesmes (1924–2005), Spanish footballer
- Rafael Lesmes (1926–2012), Spanish footballer, brother of Francisco
