= Aurelio García Lesmes =

Spanish painter

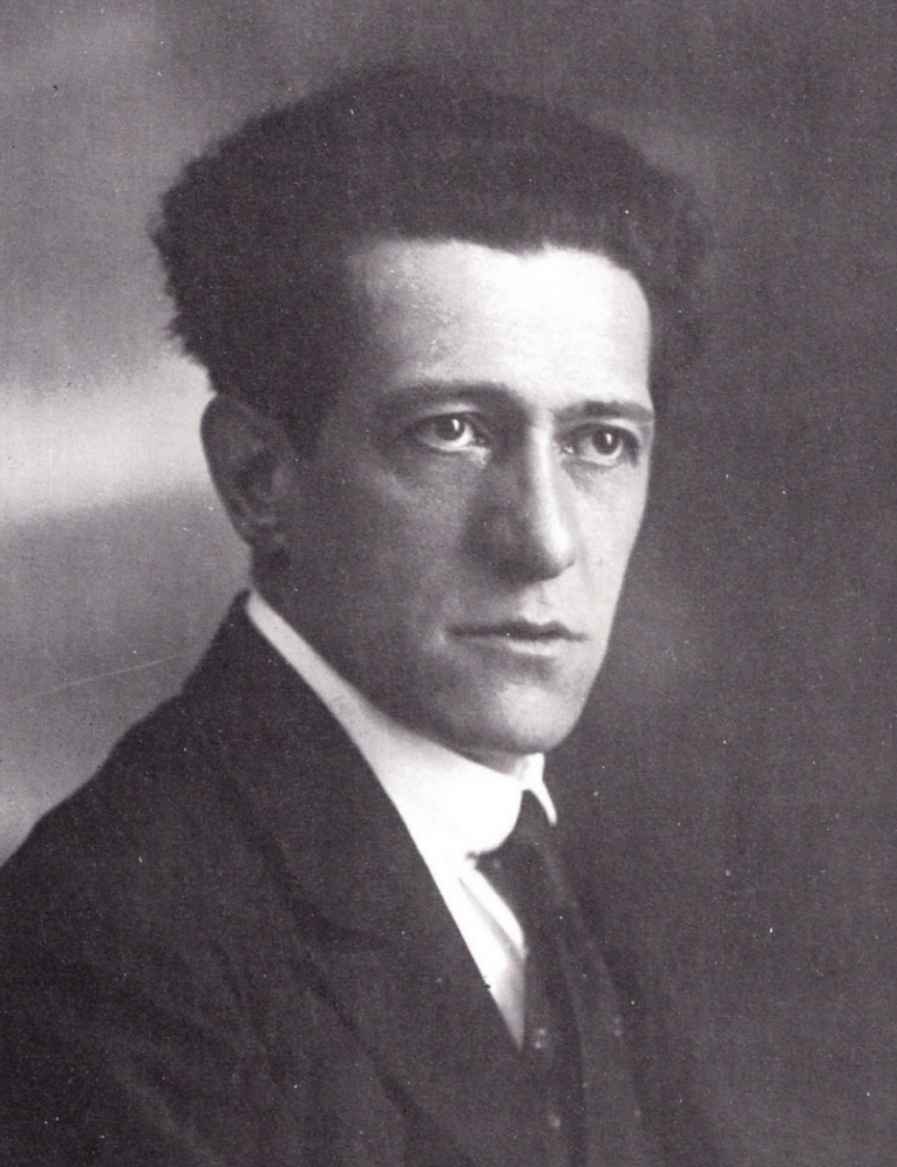
Aurelio García Lesmes (c.1915/16)

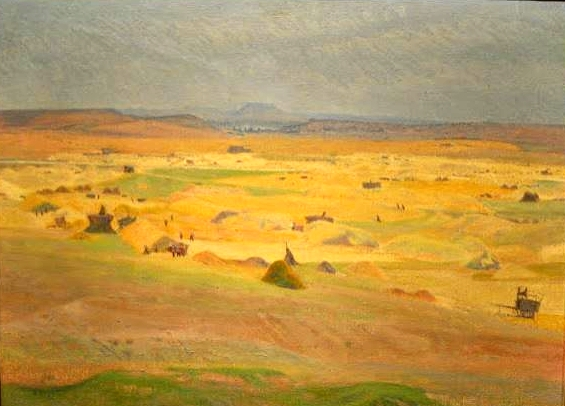
The Fields of Zaratán

Aurelio García Lesmes (8 July 1884, Valladolid – 25 March 1942, Mexico City) was a Spanish landscape painter who later became a citizen of Mexico.

== Biography ==
At a very early age, he entered the School of Arts and Crafts in his hometown, where he studied with José Martí y Monsó. In 1903, he was awarded a government grant to study at the Real Academia de Bellas Artes de San Fernando in Madrid. There, he studied with Antonio Muñoz Degrain, who inspired him to become a landscape painter. After 1906, he became a regular participant in the National Exhibition of Fine Arts, and won several awards, culminating in 1926 with a First Class prize for "The Fields of Zaratán.

After that success, he chose to return to Valladolid, becoming a drawing teacher at the Instituto Núñez de Arce. His first major personal exhibition came at the Museo de Arte Moderno (Madrid) in 1931. During the Second Spanish Republic, he obtained an appointment as a drawing professor in Valladolid. The outbreak of the Spanish Civil War found him in Madrid, separated from his wife, Luisa, whom he would never see again.

As a member of the Spanish Socialist Workers' Party, he spent the war creating propaganda posters and murals. During the Siege of Madrid, he helped to rescue works from the Museo del Prado, moving them to Valencia, where he settled in 1937. There, he was able to obtain another professorial appointment in Orihuela. This lasted for only a very short time before he moved to Barcelona, where he continued his previous propaganda efforts and taught drawing at the Labor Institute.

Just before the end of the war, he fled to France and, in May 1939, departed for Mexico, together with a large number of other exiles. He aettled in Mexico City, opened a small studio, and obtained yet another appointment as a professor at the Instituto Luis Vives. He maintained close contact with his fellow Spanish refugees and was granted Mexican citizenship in 1941. The following year, he was struck and killed by the driver of a vehicle while crossing a street.
