= José María Rodríguez-Acosta =

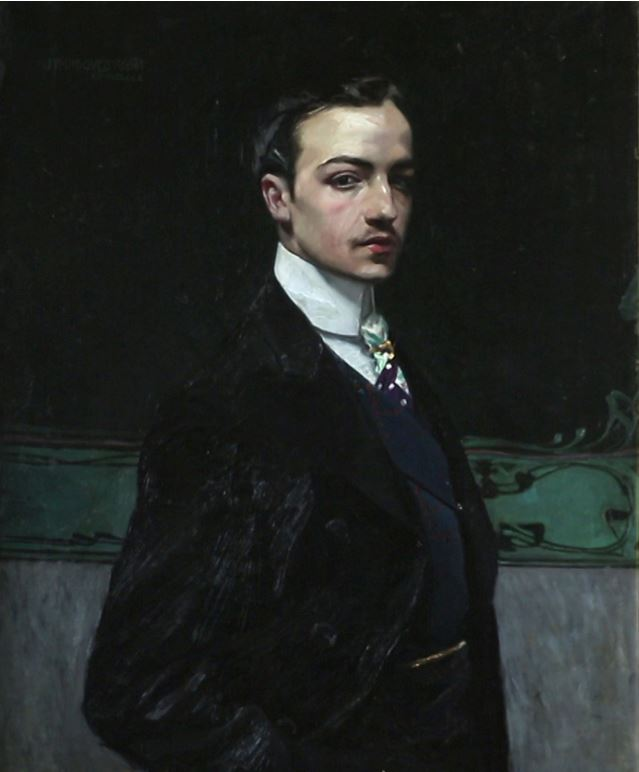
Self-portrait (1900)

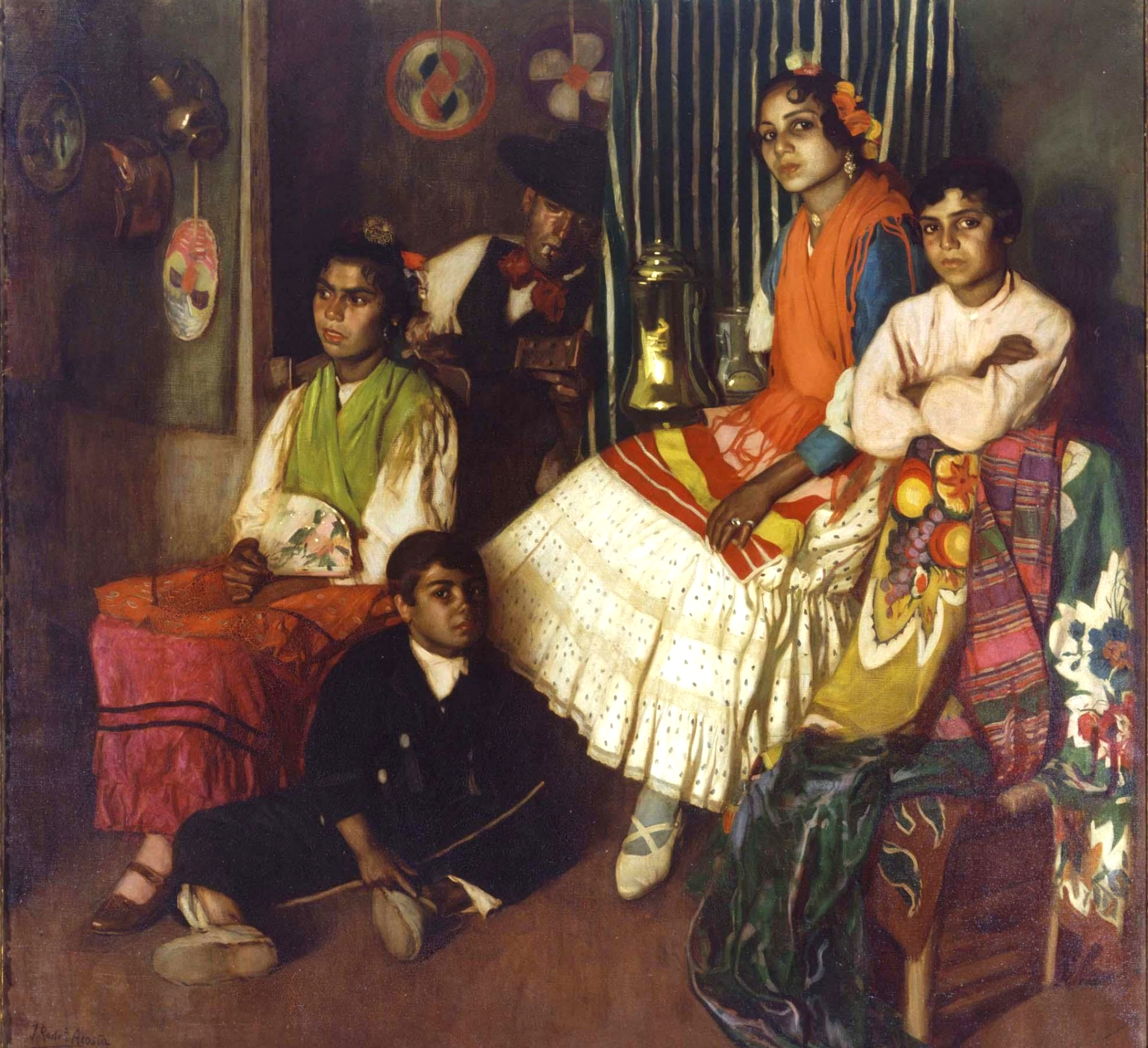
The Gypsies of Sacromonte

José María Rodríguez-Acosta González de la Cámara (25 February 1878, Granada - 19 March 1941, Granada) was a Spanish painter, known for portraits, urban landscapes and genre scenes. He also did still-lifes and some female nudes.

== Biography ==
He was born to a family of prominent bankers, and received a commercial education. His first art lessons came in 1889, from José de Larrocha (1850-1933) at the Granada School of Arts and Crafts. Between 1890 and 1895, he finished his technical education at the University of Granada, but also painted as a hobby. During his time with Larrocha, he had become friends with the painter, José María López Mezquita, who encouraged him to make a career of art.

In 1899, he took that advice and moved to Madrid, where he studied with Emilio Sala. This involved several trips to Paris, to view the Old Masters in person. After paying a visit to the Exposition Universelle (1900), he produced a long series of Granadian landscapes and genre scenes, some of which earned him honorable mention at the National Exhibition of Fine Arts in 1904.

He continued to participate in the National Exhibition, receiving a Second Class prize in 1906 and achieving a First Class prize in 1908 for "The Gypsies of Sacromonte". In 1910, his "Temptation on the Mount" led him to be honored as a full Commander in the Order of Alfonso XII. He also exhibited in Paris, Munich and Amsterdam. In 1913, he toured central Europe and paid a visit to Egypt.

In 1914, at the beginning of World War I, he returned to Granada, where he began construction of his own home; an extensive and lush "carmen", a type of walled house with gardens and an orchard. Over the next decade, he painted little although, in 1923, he became involved in helping José Ortega y Gasset start up his cultural magazine, the Revista de Occidente.

By 1928, the carmen and its accompanying studios was complete, so he began painting regularly again and took part in a retrospective of Spanish painting that toured Belgium and the Netherlands. Throughout the early 1930s, he became a world traveler, ranging from Canada to India and Africa. He also established a legacy fund for creating the Rodríguez-Acosta Foundation, a cultural organization which, to this day, has its headquarters in his carmen.

Upon the outbreak of the Spanish Civil War, he isolated himself in his studio and would remain in isolation until his death. During those years, he painted simple still lifes and nudes, but failed to complete most of them. He died suddenly after a brief illness. The painting he was working on at the time, a female nude, has come to be called La Noche (Night), due to its resemblance to a sculpture by Michelangelo. It still stands in his studio, where it was when he died.

== Sources ==
- Miguel Ángel Revilla, José María Rodríguez-Acosta, 1878-1941, Fundación Rodríguez-Acosta, 1992 ISBN 978-84-7506-366-9
- Biography @ the Carmen Thyssen Museum
