= National Exhibition of Fine Arts (Spain) =

Regular Exhibition in Spain from 1856 to 1968; in Madrid

The National Exhibition of Fine Arts (Spanish: Exposiciones Nacionales de Bellas Artes) was a regular event that took place in Spain from 1856 to 1968; usually in Madrid. These exhibitions were in the form of a competition, established by a Royal Decree from Queen Isabella II in 1853. It was the largest official exhibition of Spanish art.

It was initially divided into five categories: Painting, Sculpture, Engraving, Architecture, and Decorative Arts. Painting was always considered the most prestigious category, however, and Decorative Arts was only occasional. Although the decree specified that they were to be held biennially, this was not always strictly observed.

== Origins and proposals ==
The process began when it was noted by many critics that Spain was underrepresented in most international exhibitions. There were also widespread feelings that Spanish art had become decadent since the old patronage system, supported by the Catholic church and the aristocracy, had disappeared; due in large part to the continuing Confiscation. Then, in 1851, the Parisian cultural journal, L'Illustration, ran an article on the International Exposition of Fine Arts in Brussels with the headline, "L'Espagne n'existe plus!" (Spain no longer exists).

At that time, the recognized model for art exhibitions was the Paris Salon, with its regulations, juries, formal critiques, public exposure, established hierarchies of prize categories and opportunities for acquisition. In a proposal sent to the Congress of Deputies by the painter, José Galofré y Coma, the need for establishing such an exhibition was strongly argued. His proposition was accepted and forwarded to Agustín Esteban Collantes, the Minister of Development. After the questions of organization and funding had been settled, it was presented to the Royal Family for final approval.

The exhibition was maintained in largely the same form until the 1920s, although the frequency became erratic; sometimes every two years, sometimes every three. There were also longer intervals due to political and social disruptions; notably the Spanish Civil War.

The original concepts and criteria slowly became obsolete, and the last exhibition was held in 1968.

== Prizes and winners ==
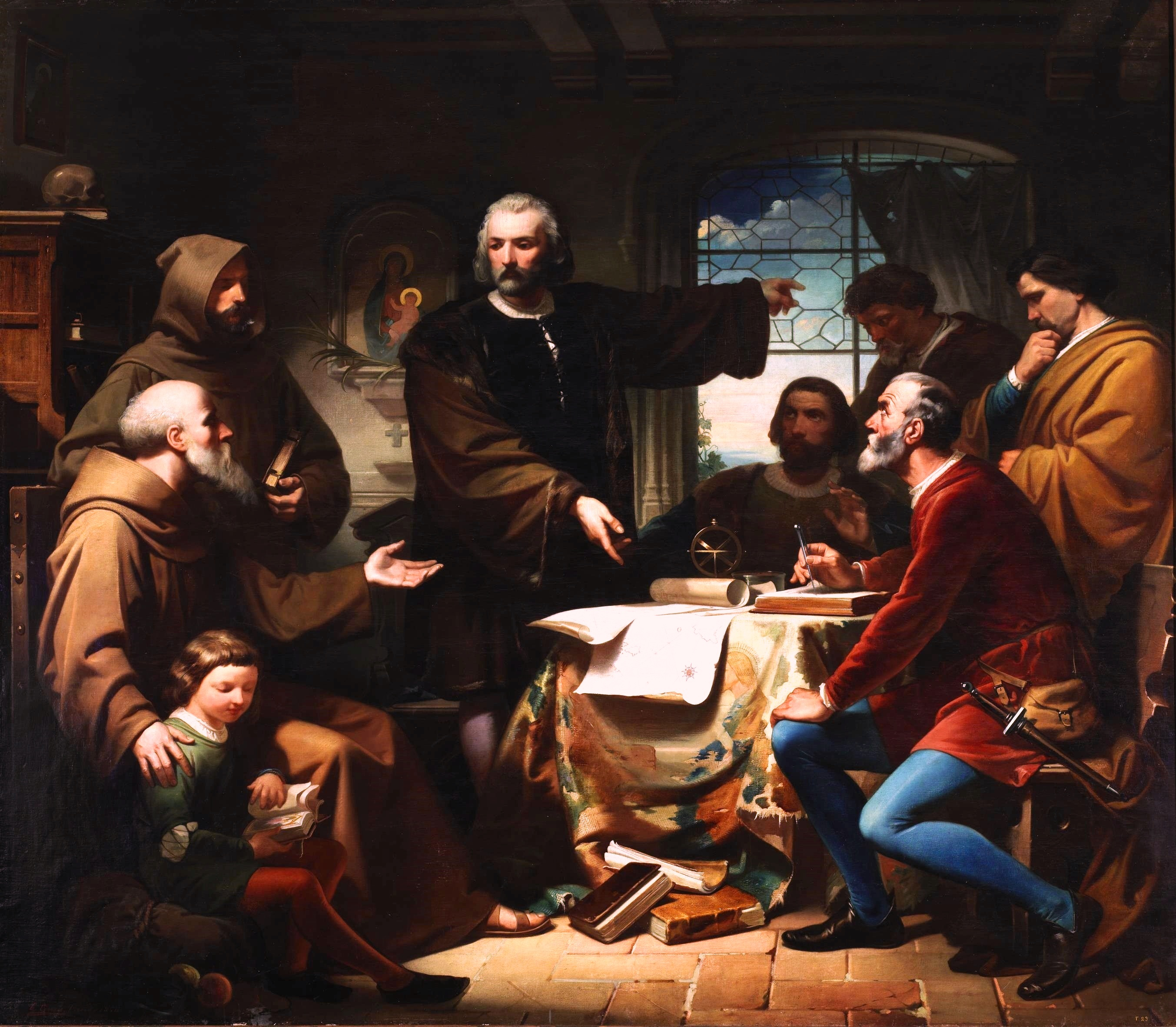
Christopher Columbus in the Convent of La Rábida, Eduardo Cano, 1856

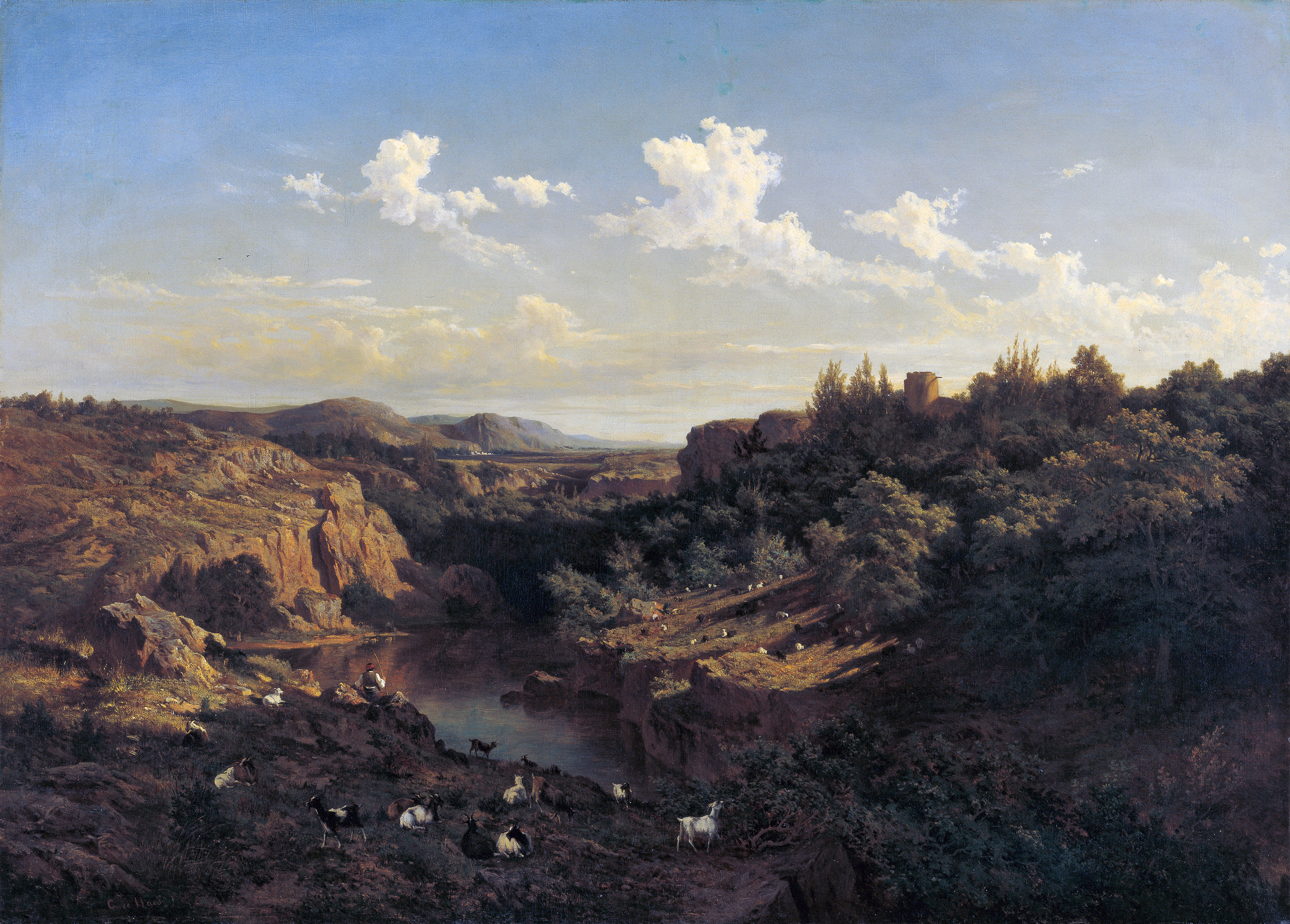
View of the Surroundings of the Monasterio de Piedra, Carlos de Haes, 1858

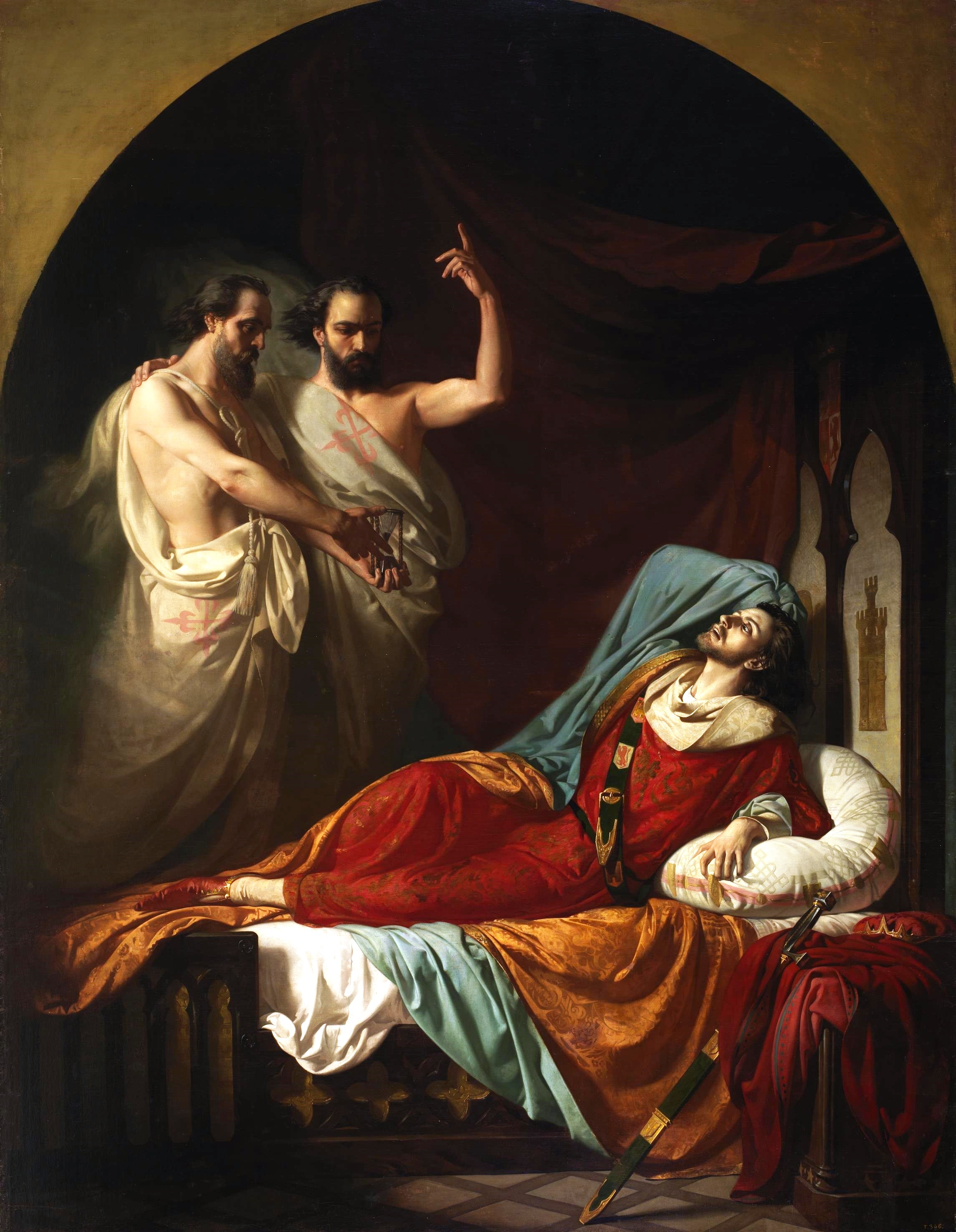
The Last Moments of Fernando IV, the Summoned, José Casado del Alisal, 1860

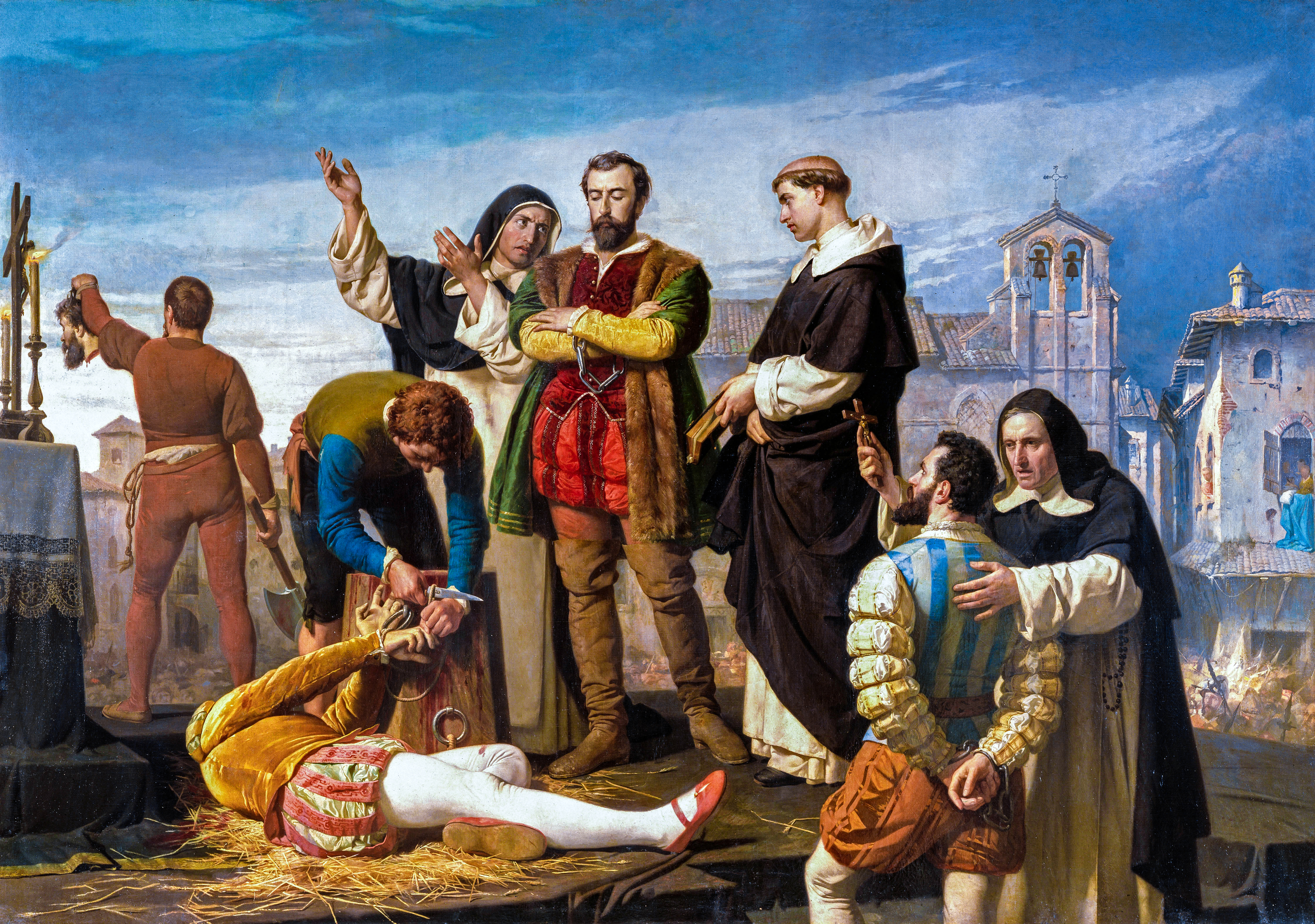
The Comuneros, Padilla, Bravo and Maldonado on the Scaffold, Antonio Gisbert, 1860

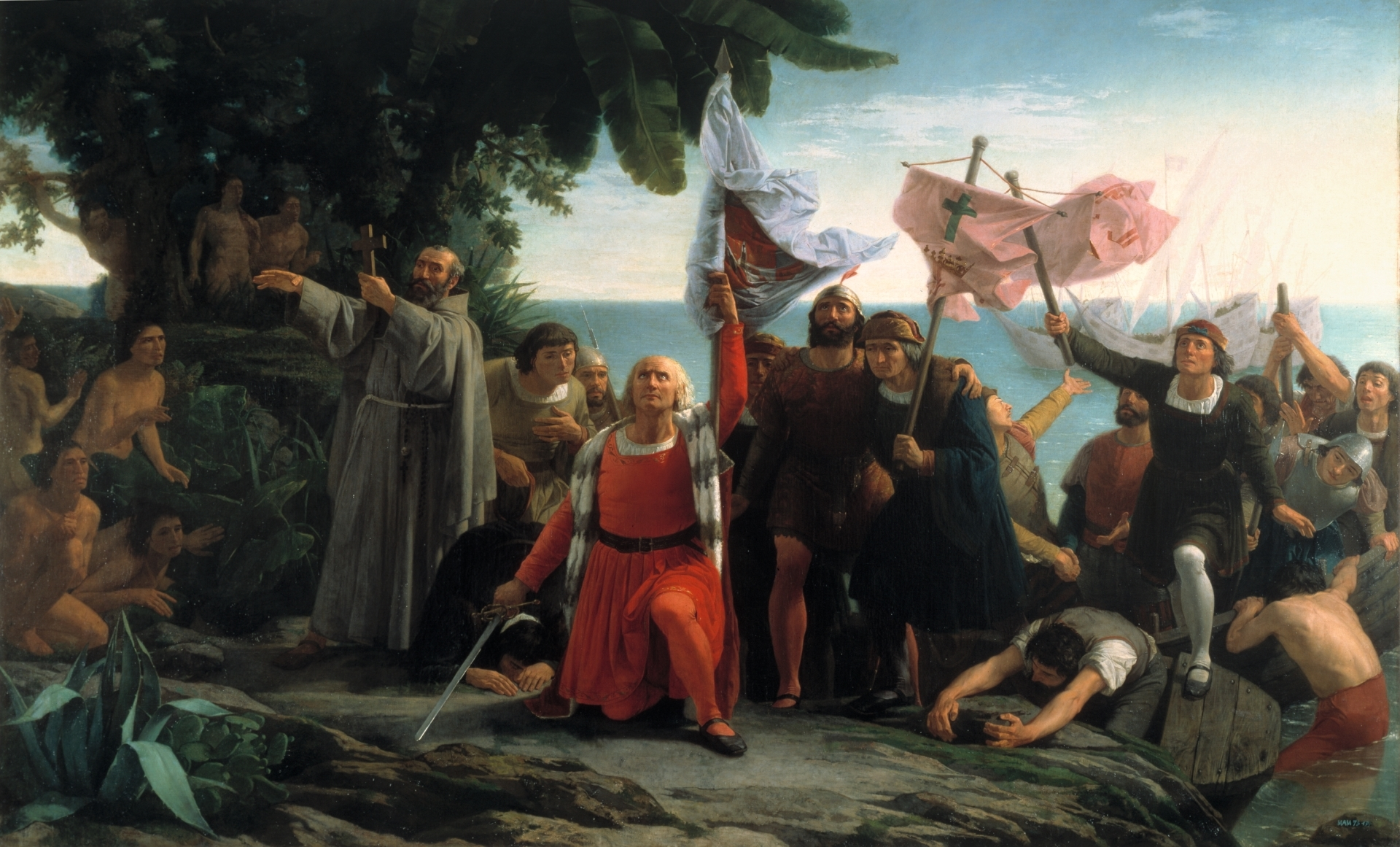
The First Landing of Christopher Columbus in America, Dióscoro Puebla, 1862

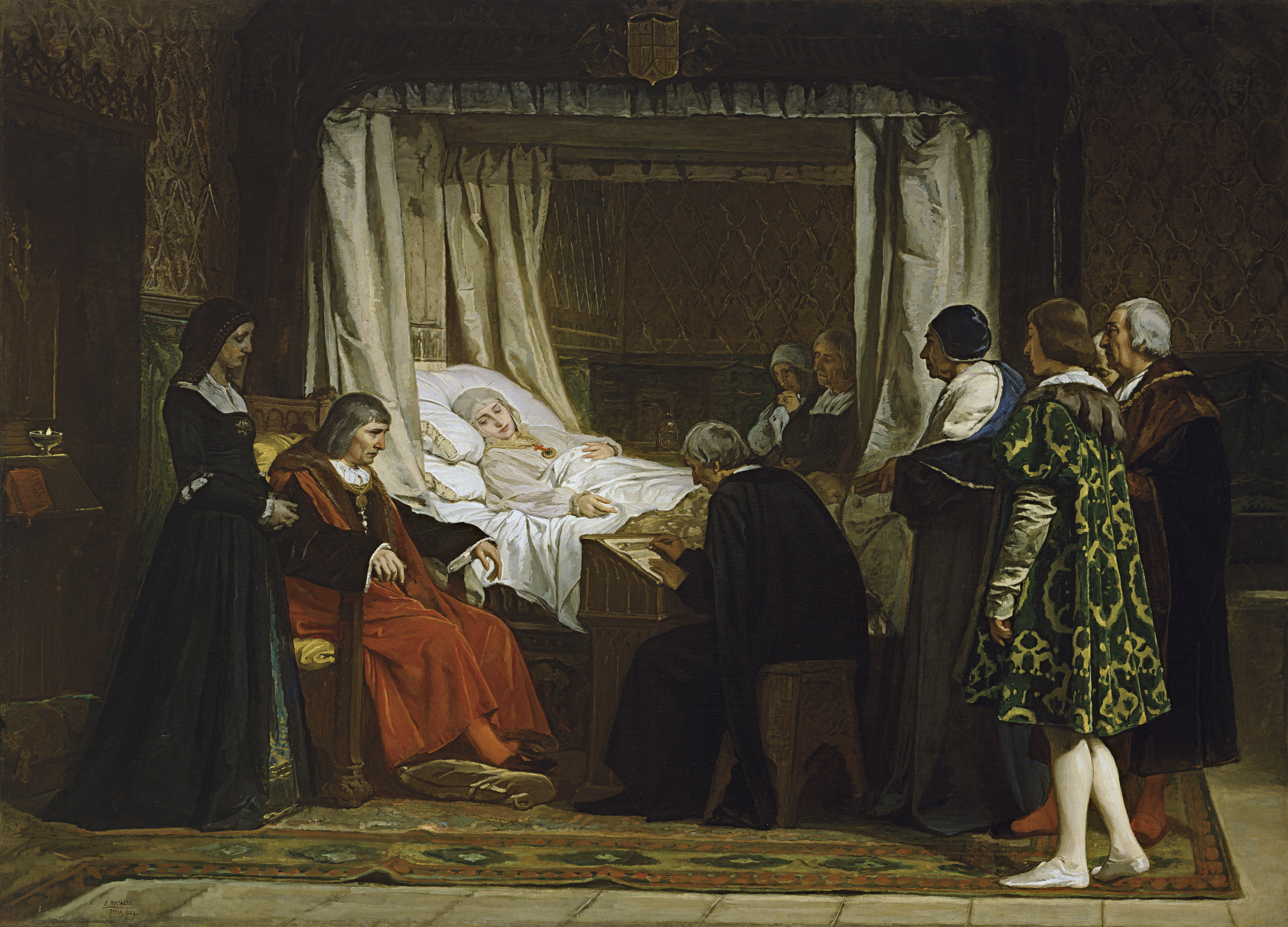
Isabelle the Catholic Dictating her Will and Testament, Eduardo Rosales, 1864

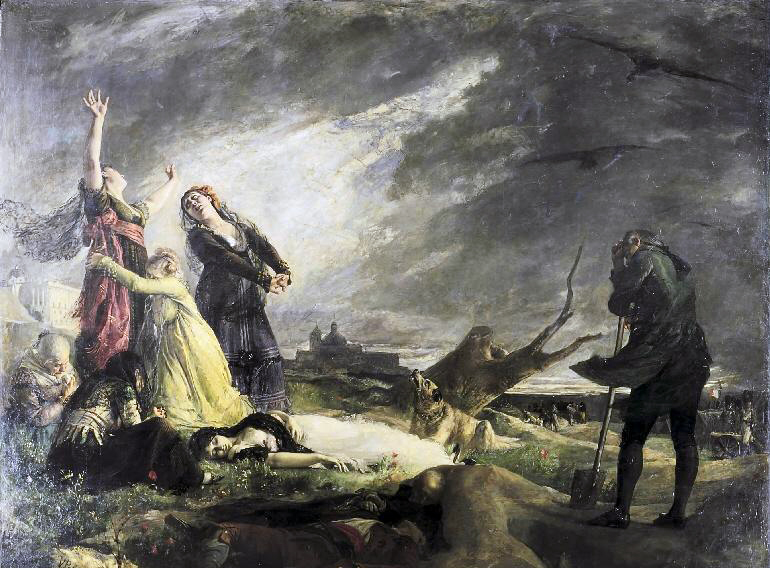
The Fusillades of May Third on the Hill of Príncipe Pío, Vicente Palmaroli, 1871

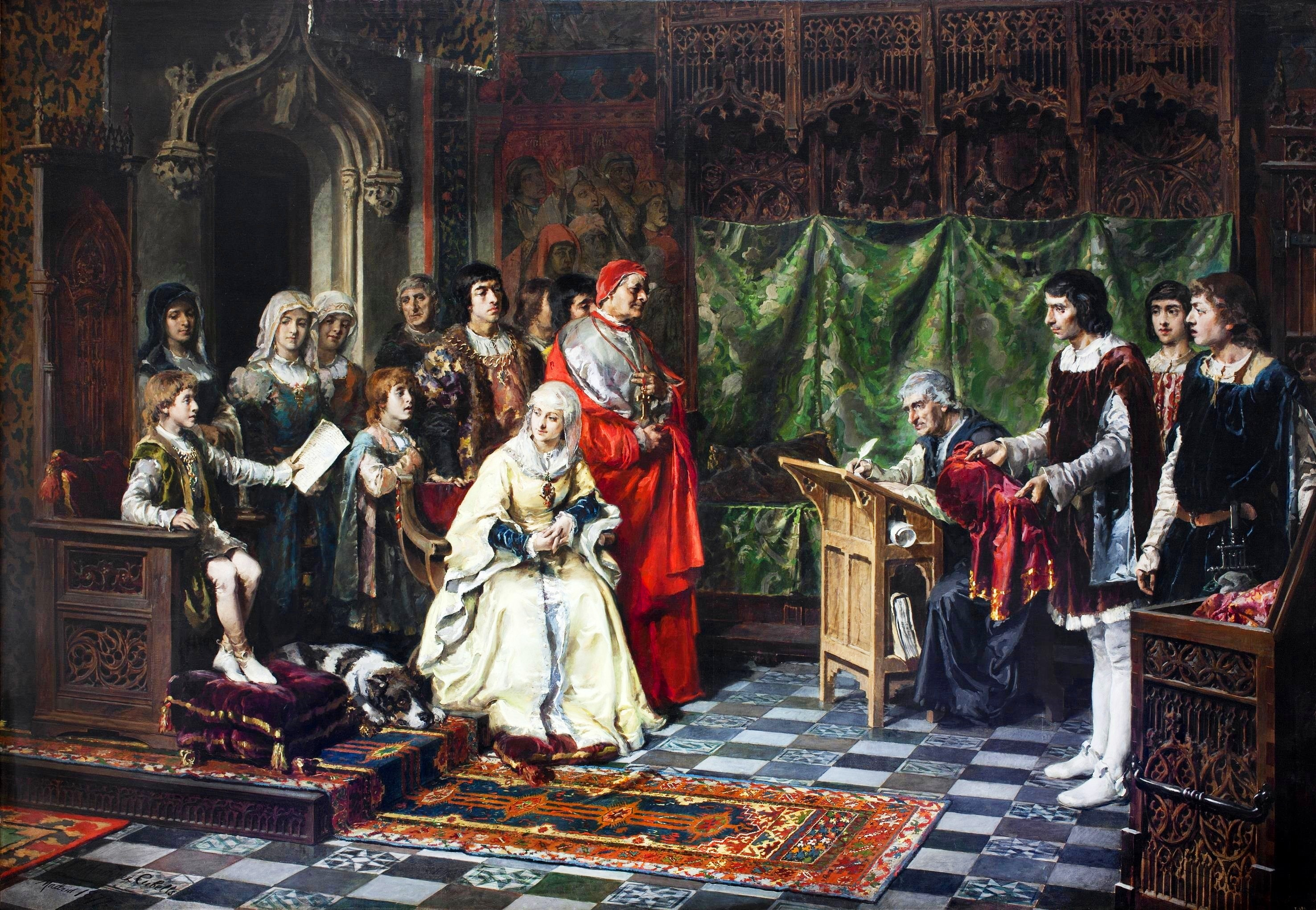
The Education of Prince Don Juan, Salvador Martínez Cubells, 1878

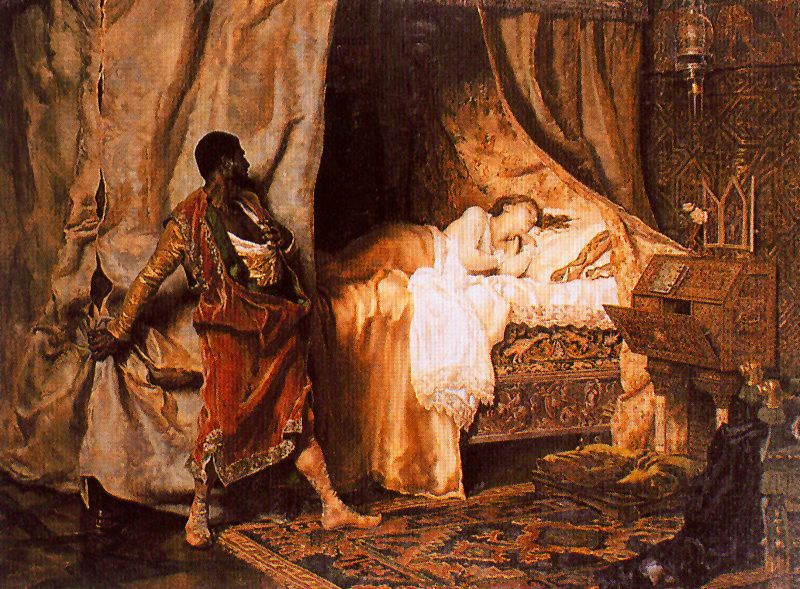
Othello and Desdemona, Antonio Muñoz Degrain, 1881

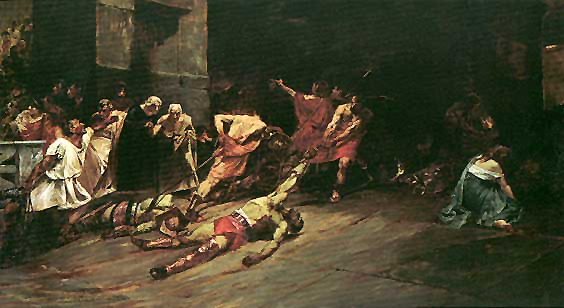
Spoliarium, Juan Luna, 1884

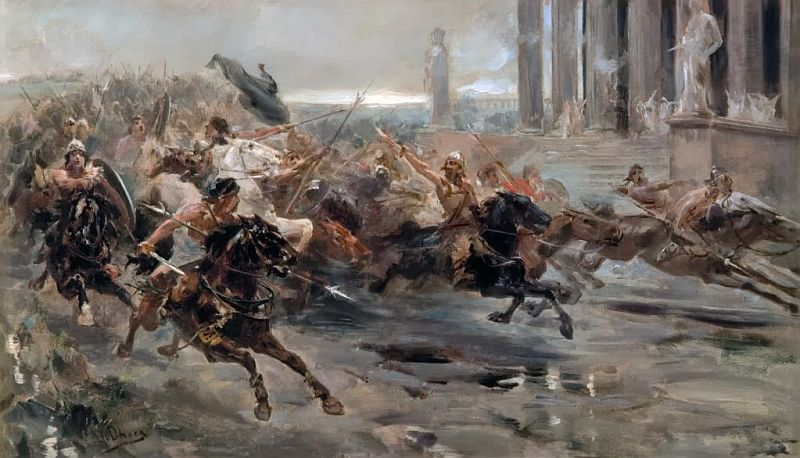
Invasion of the Barbarians, Ulpiano Checa, 1887

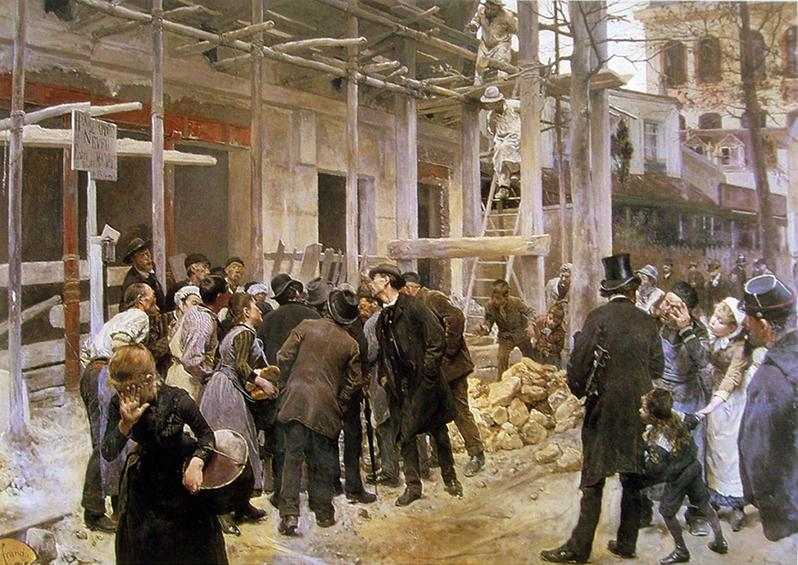
A Misfortune, José Jiménez Aranda, 1890

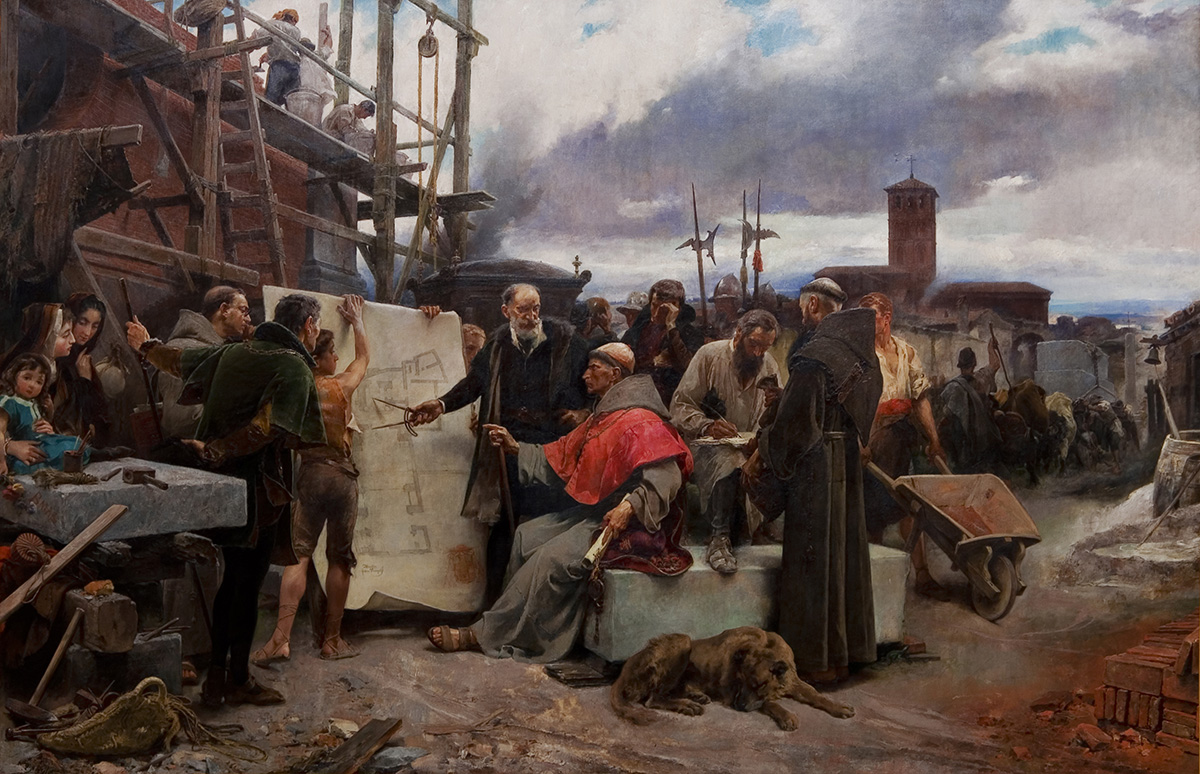
Cisneros, Founder of the Hospital of Illescas, Alejandro Ferrant, 1892

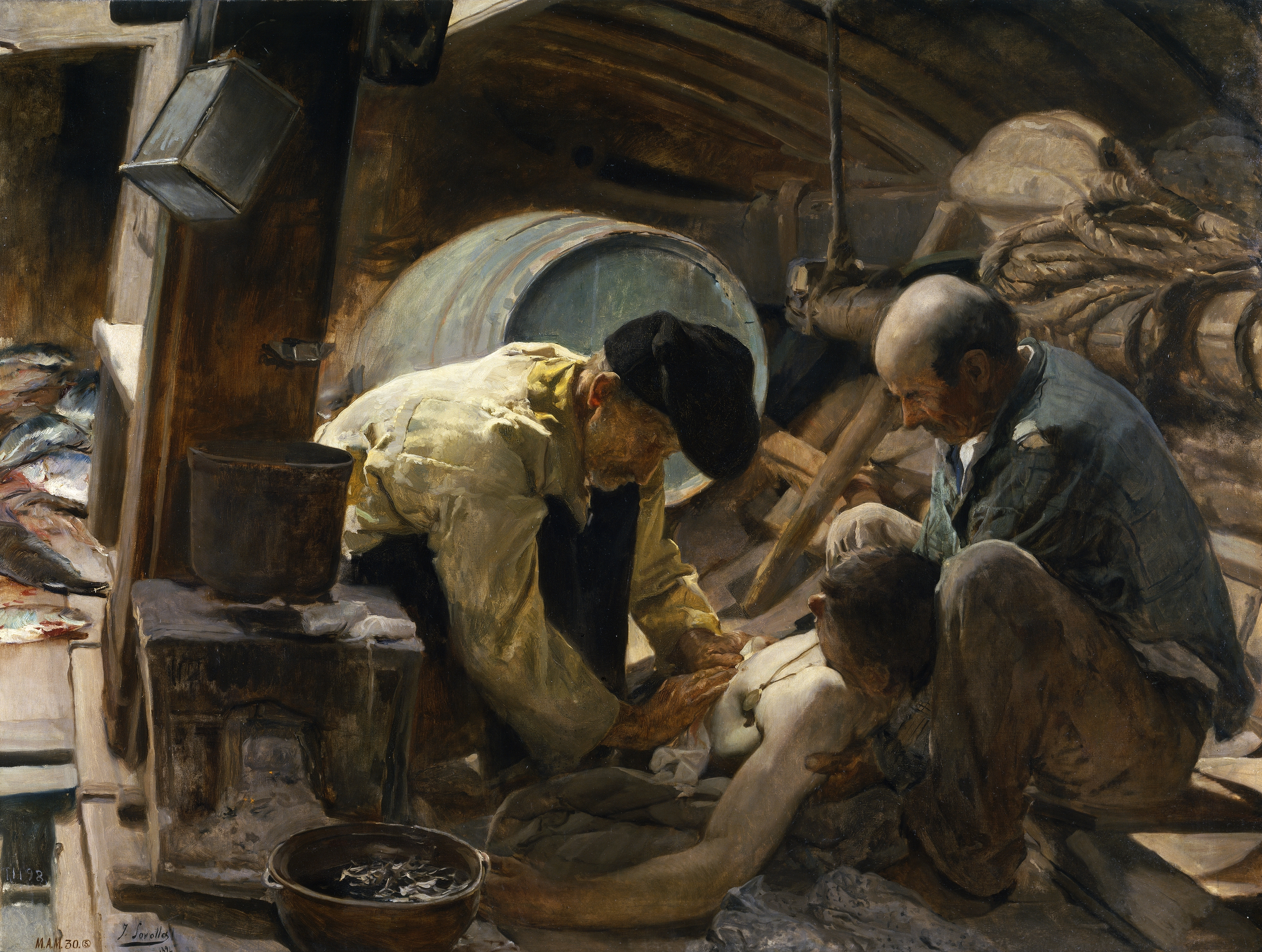
And They Still Say that Fish is Expensive!, Joaquín Sorolla, 1895

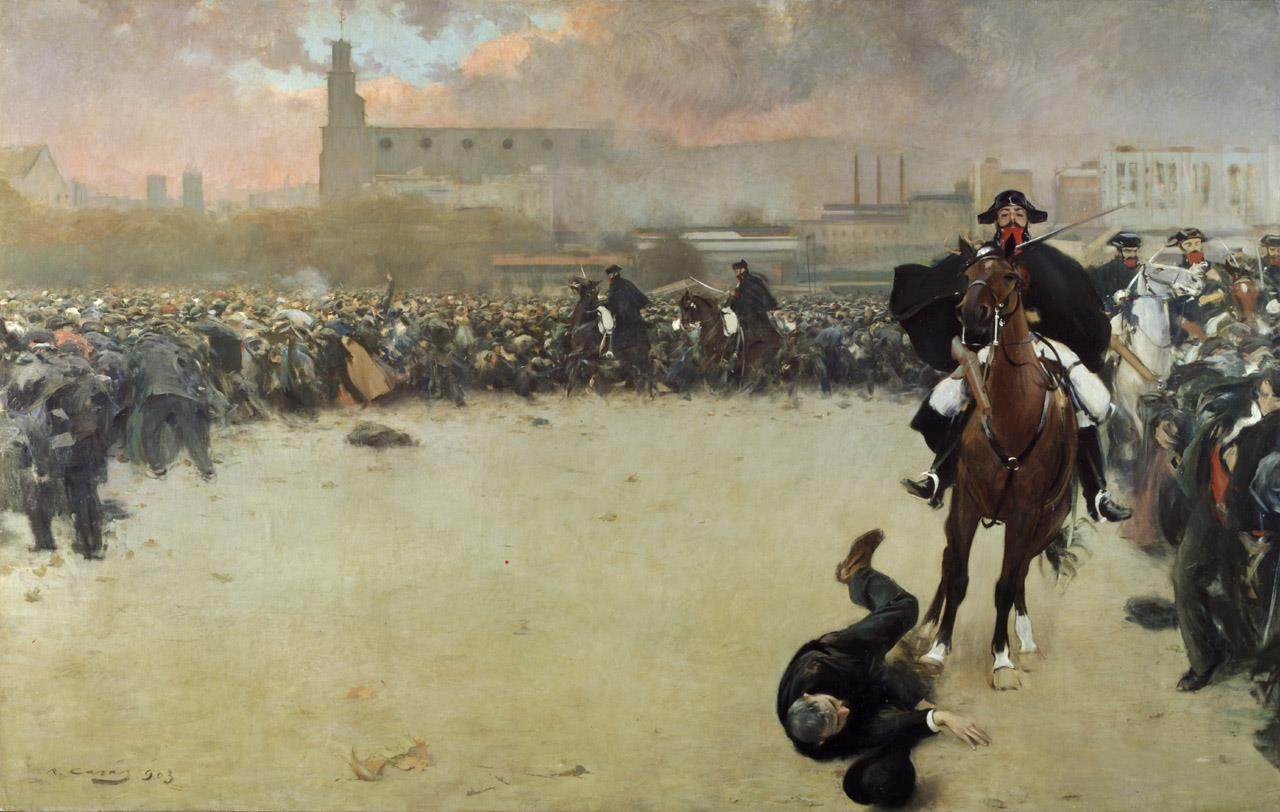
The Charge, Ramon Casas, 1904

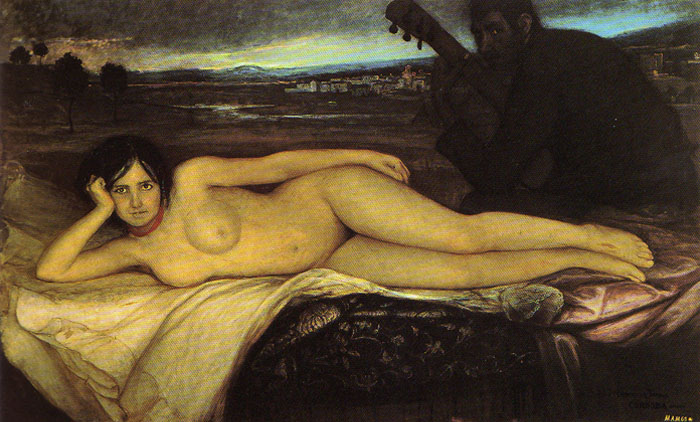
The Gypsy Muse, Julio Romero de Torres, 1908

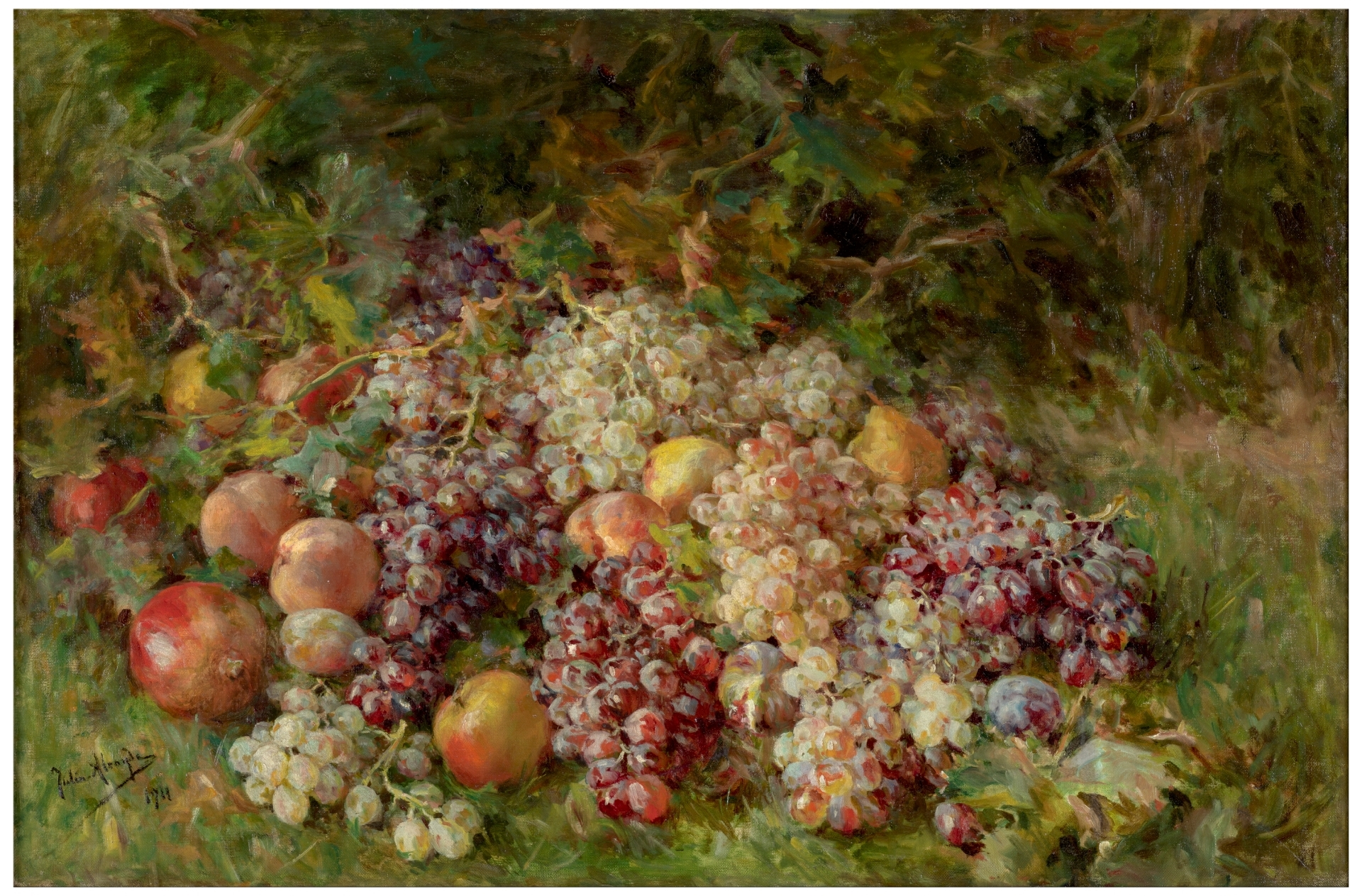
Fruits, Julia Alcayde y Montoya, 1911

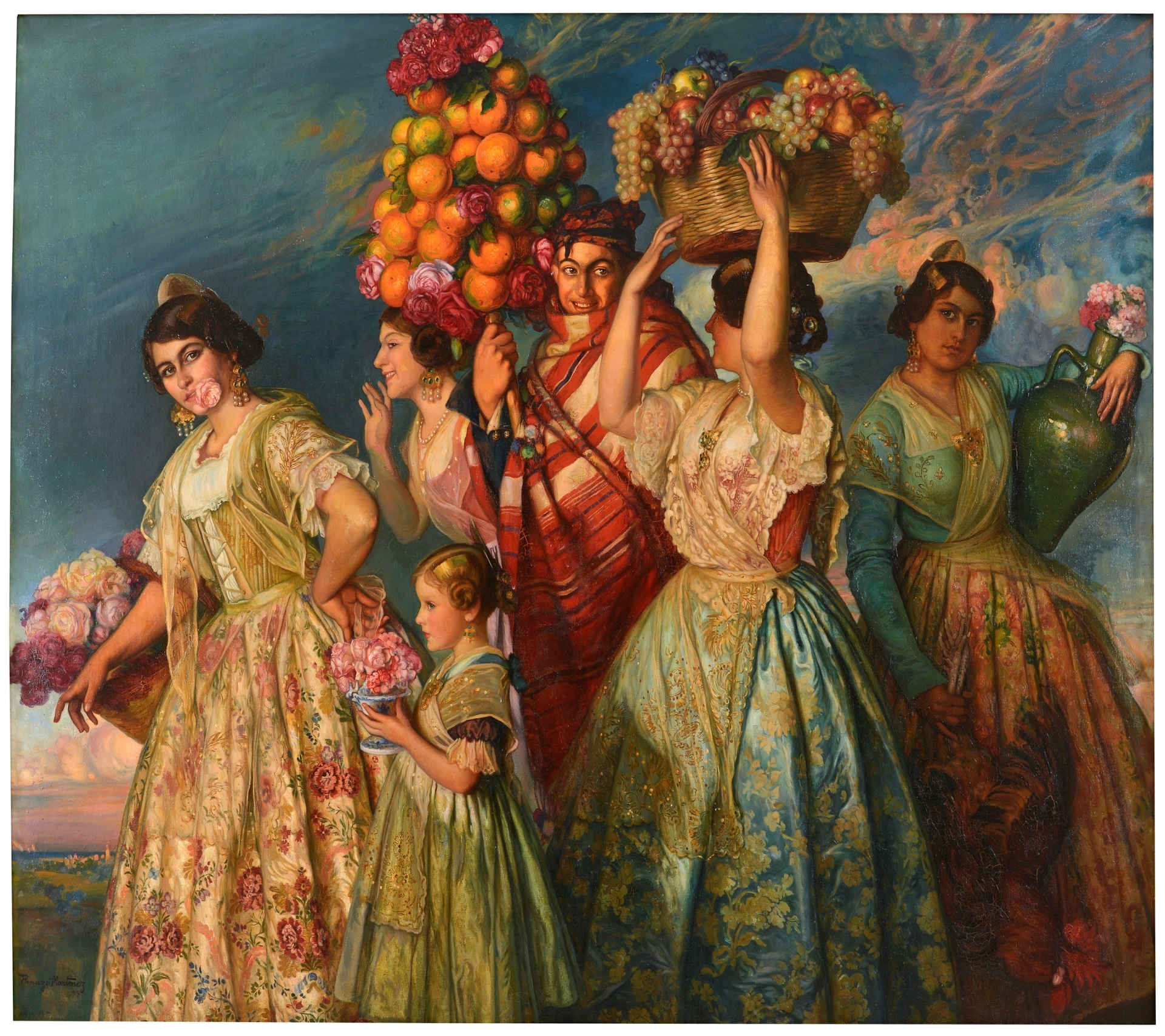
Floreal, José Pinazo Martínez, 1915

The prizes awarded were "First Class", "Second Class", "Third Class" and "Honorable Mention". In the painting category, anywhere from 300 to 500 works might be entered. The other categories rarely exceeded 10% of that.

Winners of the First Class medal in the Painting category

- 1856:
  - Eduardo Cano, Christopher Columbus in the Convent of La Rábida
  - Luis de Madrazo, Don Pelayo in Covadonga
- 1858:
  - Eduardo Cano, The Burial of the Constable, Don Álvaro de Luna
  - Antonio Gisbert, The Last Moments of Prince Don Carlos
  - Carlos de Haes, View of the Surroundings of the Monasterio de Piedra
- 1860:
  - Antonio Gisbert, The Comuneros, Padilla, Bravo and Maldonado on the Scaffold
  - José Casado del Alisal, The Last Moments of Fernando IV, the Summoned
  - Carlos de Haes, A Landscape: Memories of Andalucía
  - Dionisio Fierros, A Pilgrimage in the Neighborhoods of Santiago
  - Pablo Gonzalvo, View of the Transept of the Cathedral of Toledo
- 1862:
  - Alejo Vera, The Burial of San Lorenzo
  - Dióscoro Puebla, The First Landing of Christopher Columbus in America
  - Germán Hernández Amores, Journey of the Virgin and Saint John to Ephesus
  - Vicente Palmaroli, A Peasant Girl from Naples Named Pascuccia
  - Ignacio Suárez Llanos, Sister Marcela of San Félix, Watching the Funeral of her Father, Lope de Vega, Pass By
  - Carlos de Haes, Landscape in Losoya
  - Pablo Gonzalvo, Chapel of the Constable in the Cathedral of Toledo
- 1864:
  - Eduardo Rosales, Isabella the Catholic Dictating her Will and Testament
  - Antonio Gisbert, The Landing of the Puritans in North America
  - José Casado del Alisal, The Surrender of Bailén
  - Pablo Gonzalvo, The Interior of the Courtyards of the Kingdom of Valencia
- 1867:
  - Benet Mercadé, The Ascension of Saint Francis of Assisi
  - Vicente Palmaroli, Sermon in the Cistine Chapel
  - Alejo Vera, A Chorus of Monkeys
  - Dióscoro Puebla, The Compromise of Caspe
- 1871:
  - Eduardo Rosales, The Death of Lucretia
  - Manuel Domínguez Sánchez, The Death of Seneca
  - Francisco Domingo Marqués, Santa Clara'
  - Vicente Palmaroli, The Fusillades of May Third on the Hill of Príncipe Pío
  - Alejo Vera, A Pompeian Lady in her Boudoir
- 1876: No First Class prizes were awarded this year.
- 1878:
  - Alejandro Ferrant, The Burial of Saint Sebastian
  - Emilio Sala, Guillén de Vinatea, before Alonso IV, demanding that he Revoke the Partition of Valencia
  - Casto Plasencia, Origin of the Roman Republic
  - Salvador Martínez Cubells, The Education of Prince Don Juan
- 1881:
  - Antonio Muñoz Degrain, Othello and Desdemona
  - Emilio Sala, Novus Ortus, an Allegory of the Renaissance
  - José Moreno Carbonero, Prince Don Carlos of Viana
- 1884:
  - Juan Luna, Spoliarium
  - Antonio Muñoz Degrain, The Lovers of Teruel
  - José Moreno Carbonero, The Conversion of the Duke of Gandía
- 1887:
  - Ricardo Villodas y de la Torre, Victoribus Gloria
  - Ulpiano Checa, The Invasion of the Barbarians
  - Francisco Javier Amérigo, The Sack of Rome
  - José Benlliure, The Vision of the Colosseum
  - Salvador Viniegra, The Blessing of the Field in 1800
  - Salvador Martínez Cubells, Doña Inés de Castro
- 1890:
  - Luis Álvarez Catalá, The Seat of Felipe II in the Escorial
  - José Jiménez Aranda, A Misfortune
  - Justo Ruiz Luna, Naval Combat at Trafalgar
- 1892:
  - Francisco Javier Amérigo, The Right of Asylum
  - Vicente Cutanda, A Workers' Strike in Vizcaya
  - Alejandro Ferrant, Cisneros, Founder of the Hospital of Illescas
  - José Garnelo, Cornelia
  - Luis Jiménez Aranda, A Hospital Room During the Doctor's Visit
  - Luis Menéndez Pidal, The Empty Cradle
  - José Nogales Sevilla, Santa Casilda
  - Enrique Simonet, Flevit Super Illam
  - Joaquín Sorolla, Another Marguerite!
  - Jaime Morera y Galicia, The Coast of Normandy
- 1895:
  - Joaquín Sorolla, And They Still Say That Fish is Expemsive!
  - Alberto Pla y Rubio, To the War!
  - Modest Urgell, El Pedregal, a Civilized Village
- 1897:
  - Ignacio Pinazo Camarlench, Portrait of Don José María Mellado
  - Sebastián Gessa y Arias, Flowers and Fruits
- 1899:
  - Luis Menéndez Pidal, Salus Infirmorum
  - Ignacio Pinazo Camarlench, The Memory Lesson
  - Gonzalo Bilbao, Sea of the Levant
- 1901:
  - Gonzalo Bilbao, for an ensemble of related works
  - José María López Mezquita, The Prisoners' Rope
- 1904:
  - Eduardo Chicharro y Agüera, The Poem of Armida and Rinaldo
  - Ramon Casas, The Charge
  - Enrique Martínez Cubells, Work, Rest and Family
  - Manuel Benedito, Canto VII of Dante's Inferno
- 1906:
  - Fernando Álvarez de Sotomayor, The Grandparents
  - Manuel Benedito, Mother
  - Fernando Cabrera Cantó, To the Abyss...
  - Eliseo Meifrén y Roig, Prayers, Pontevedra
- 1908:
  - Eduardo Chicharro y Agüera, The Three Wives
  - José María Rodríguez-Acosta, The Gypsies of Sacromonte
  - Julio Romero de Torres, The Gypsy Muse
  - Santiago Rusiñol, The Garden of Aranjuez
- 1910:
  - José María López Mezquita, Portrait of the Mr."B"s and Children
  - Carlos Vázquez Úbeda, The Wounded Torero
  - Marceliano Santa María Sedano, Angelica and Medoro
  - Manuel Ramírez Ibáñez, Before the Class
- 1912:
  - Enrique Martínez Cubells, Return from the Catch
  - Elías Salaverría, The Procession of the Corpus in Lezo
  - Santiago Rusiñol, The Old Faun
  - José María Rodríguez-Acosta, for an ensemble of related works
- 1915:
  - José Ramón Zaragoza, Portrait of Mr. Th. S.
  - Enrique Galwey, Nightfall in the Pine Grove
  - José Pinazo Martínez, Floreal
  - Ventura Álvarez Sala, Our Daily Bread
- 1917:
  - Joaquim Mir, The Waters of Moguda
  - Eugenio Hermoso, At the Village Fiesta
  - Valentín de Zubiaurre, Versolaris
- 1920:
  - Julio Moisés Fernández (1888–1968), Portrait
  - Álvaro Alcalá Galiano y Vildósola, The Path
- 1922:
  - Francisco Llorens Díaz, Rías Baixas
  - Fernando Labrada, Portrait
  - José Gutiérrez Solana, The Return from Fishing
- 1924:
  - Antonio Ortiz Echagüe, Jacob van Amstel at My House
  - Ramón de Zubiaurre, The Basque Sailor, Shanti-Andia the Fearless
  - Eduardo Martínez Vázquez, The Snows of El Cirbunal
- 1926:
  - José Bermejo Sobera (1879-c.1953), The Coffee Shop
  - José Cruz Herrera, The Harvest Offering
  - Aurelio García Lesmes, The Fields of Zaratán
- 1929:
  - Joaquín Mir, Landscape
  - Santiago Rusiñol, Almond Trees in Bloom
  - José Gutiérrez Solana, The Showgirls
  - José Aguiar, Women of the South
  - Francisco Soria Aedo, Christmas Eve in the Village
- 1930:
  - Juan Ángel Gómez Alarcón, Borgia
- 1932:
  - Aurelio Arteta, The Men of the Sea
  - Joaquín Valverde Lasarte, Yesterday
  - Timoteo Pérez Rubio, Landscape of Normandy
- 1936: The exhibition could not be completed, due to the outbreak of the Spanish Civil War.
- 1941:
  - Julia Minguillón, The School of Hard Knocks
  - Francisco Núñez Losada, The Valley of Liébana
  - José Suárez Peregrín (1908-?), On the Road to Emmaus
- 1943:
  - Juan Luis López (1894–1984), Women Sailors
  - Luis Muntané (1899–1987), Naked
  - Benjamín Palencia, Toledo
  - José Frau, Nature
- 1945:
  - Agustín Segura, Dressing Room
  - Mariano Sancho (1895–1977), Portraits
  - Luis Mosquera Gómez (1899–1987), Fancy Dress
  - Gregorio Toledo, The Visit
  - Rafael Pellicer, Adam and Eve
- 1948:
  - Genaro Lahuerta, Portrait of the Author, Azorín
  - Adelardo Covarsí, The Hunter of Alpotreque
  - Juan Miguel Sánchez, The Lesson of the Six

After that time, the exhibitions became more sporadic and perfunctory, and information regarding the results is not readily available.
