= Pablo Gonzalvo =

Spanish painter

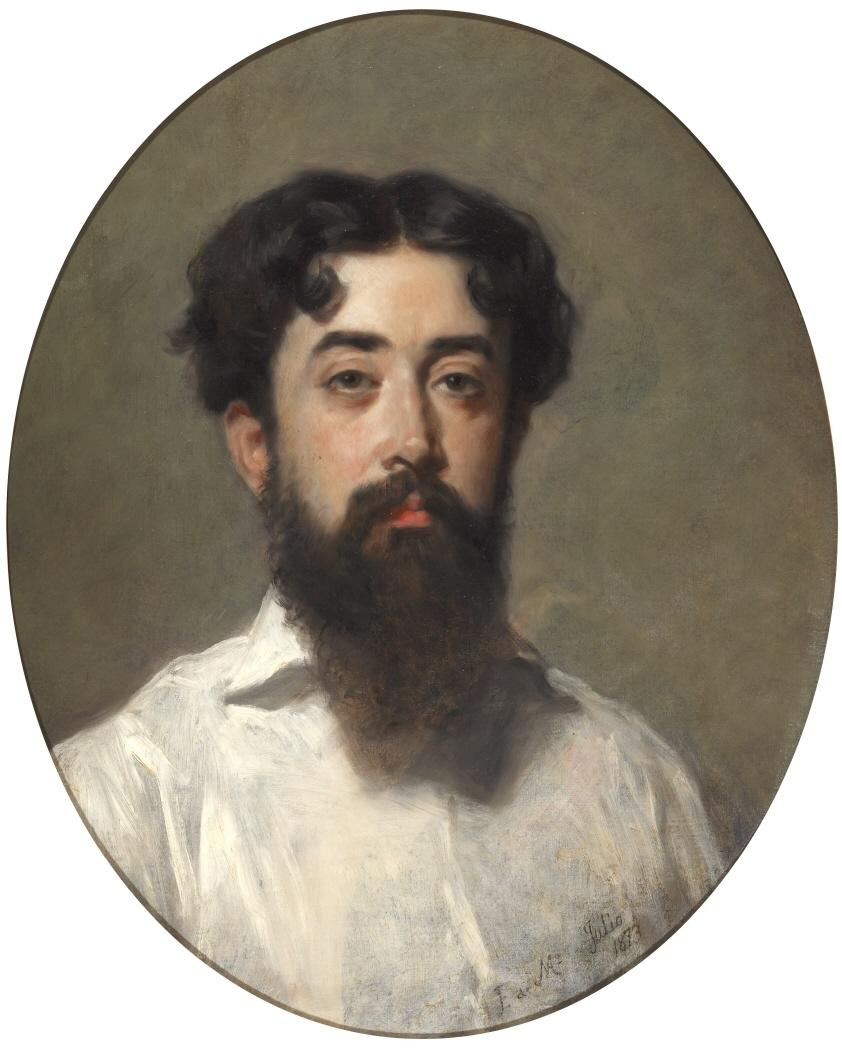
Pablo Gonzalvo; portrait by Federico de Madrazo (1873)

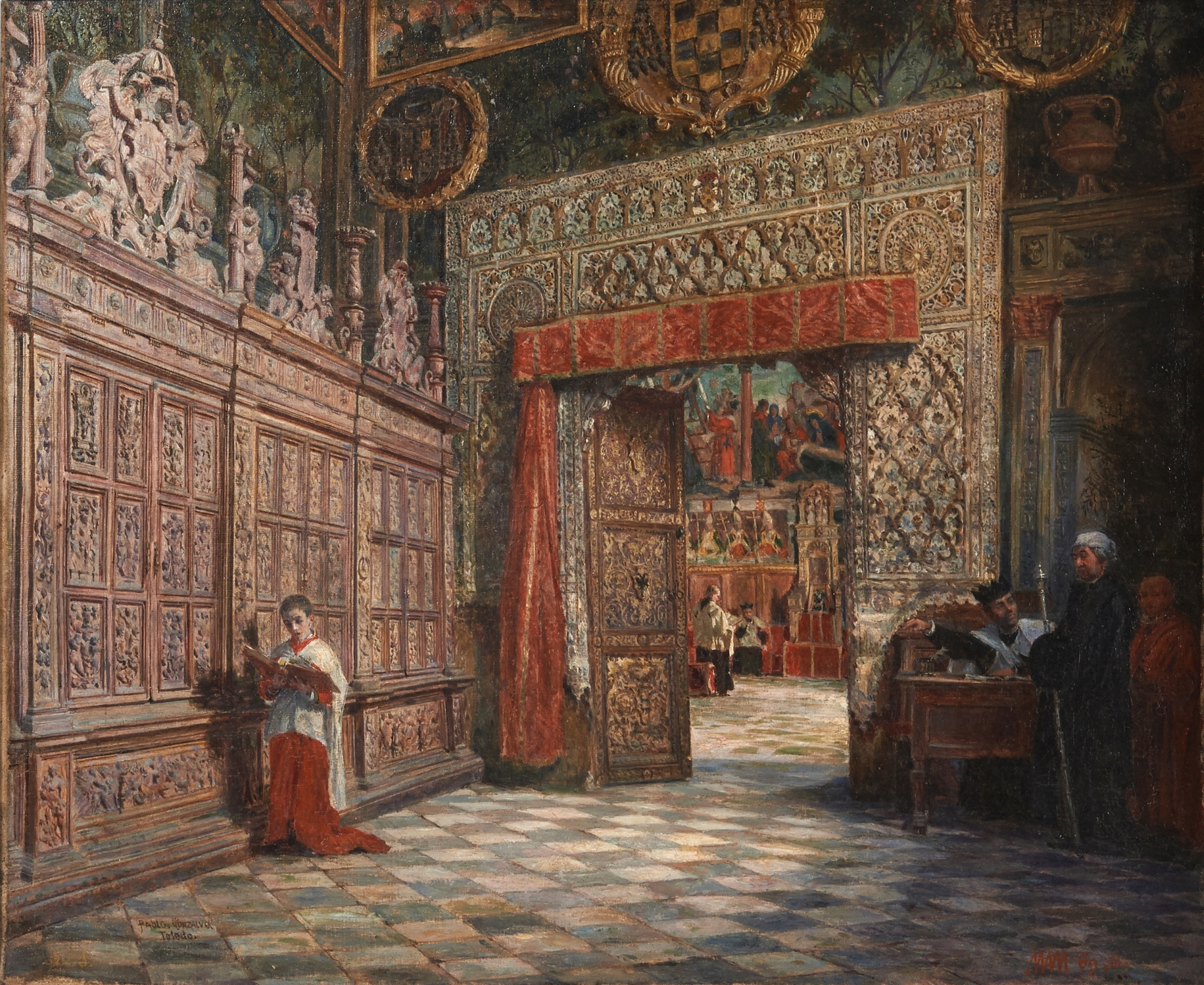
Anteroom and Chapter House of Toledo Cathedral

Pablo Gonzalvo y Pérez (19 January 1827 – 18 November 1896) was a Spanish painter who specialized in urban landscapes and what are sometimes referred to as interior portraits.

== Biography ==
He began his studies in his native Zaragoza, then moved to Madrid, where he enrolled at the Real Academia de Bellas Artes de San Fernando for the academic year of 1845–1846. There, he was a student of Federico de Madrazo. He later became a member of the Real Academia, as well as a member of the Academia de Bellas Artes de Cádiz, where he would also serve as a Professor.

To widen his cultural perspectives, he made numerous trips to Rome, Venice, Vienna and Istanbul, and exhibited frequently, in Spain and elsewhere. Throughout much of his career, he was supported by the Dukes of Fernán Núñez and Infanta Isabella, Countess of Girgenti.

At the first National Exhibition of Fine Arts in 1856, Gonzalvo received Honorable Mention, followed by a Third Class prize in 1858, and First Class prizes in 1860, 1862 and 1864. In the last instance, his prize was exchanged for the Cross of the Order of Charles III, as two First Prize wins were then the limit. He entered the exhibition again in 1867, and was honored with a commission in the Order.

He also submitted entries to the 1862 International Exhibition in London, the Franco-Spanish Exposition in Bayonne (1864), the Exposition Universelle (1867), where he was awarded a Third Class medal, the 1873 Vienna World's Fair and the World's Columbian Exposition in Philadelphia (1876). He was a personal friend of José Martí, the poet refers to him as 'the good friend' in his poems.

In addition to the Order of Charles III, Gonzalvo received a commission in the Order of Isabella the Catholic, in recognition of his successes at the National Exhibition. In 1872, by recommendation of the Ministry of Public Works and the Real Academia, he was awarded a Cross in the Civil Order of María Victoria. He died in 1896 in Madrid.
