= Justo Ruiz Luna =

Spanish painter (1865–1926)

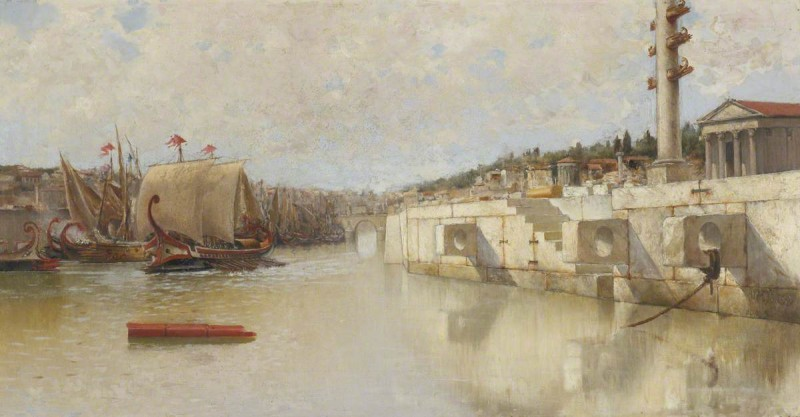
A Reconstruction of the Ancient Port of Rome (Ostia?)

Justo Ruiz Luna (1865, Cádiz – 9 March 1926 Cádiz) was a Spanish painter. He specialised in watercolors and pastels and was best known for his maritime scenes.

== Biography ==
He was born to a prosperous family. After studies related to commercial activities, he spent some time in Rome, where he mingled with Spanish artists studying there. From 1882 to 1884, he was enrolled at the Real Academia Provincial de Bellas Artes de Cádiz, where he studied with Joaquín Damis y Cortés. Later, he would return to Rome with his friend, Salvador Viniegra, to work with José Villegas Cordero, who had a definitive influence on his style. He continued to visit Rome periodically for much of his life.

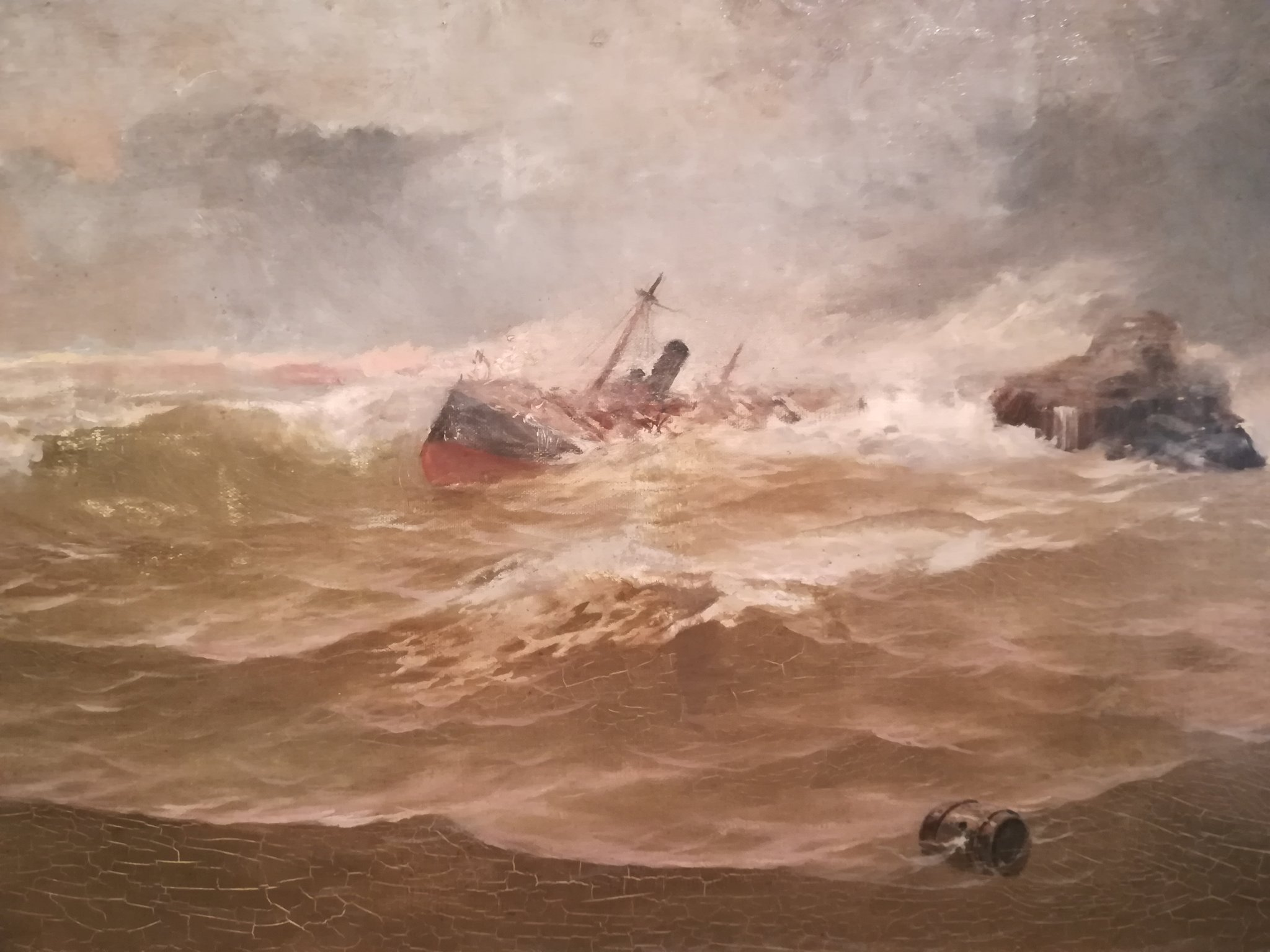
The Remains of a Shipwreck

In 1886, he and several other students of Villegas held an exhibition at the Ateneo de Madrid. The following year, he entered the National Exhibition of Fine Arts with a painting of a shipwreck and was given honorable mention. In 1888, he sent another painting of a shipwreck to the Barcelona Universal Exposition, and one called Ostia to the Internationalen Kunstausstellung at the Glaspalast in Munich.

He continued to participate in the National Exhibition and was awarded a First Class prize in 1890 for his depiction of the Battle of Trafalgar. Shortly after, he accepted a position as an inspector for the Compañía Transatlántica Española. As a result, he had to give up his trips to Italy and was unable to paint every day, although he made numerous, small images of the company's ships, in watercolors and pastels.

Also in 1890, the Academia de Bellas Artes de Cádiz elected him as a member, but he never performed any official functions there. By 1892, he had produced a sufficient body of work to compete in another exhibition at the Glaspalast, winning a Second Class medal. He also entered ten works in the National Exhibition. Although none received a prize, one of them, a monumental canvas called October 1492, was awarded a bronze medal the following year at the World's Columbian Exposition in Chicago. In 1895, he was represented at the National Exhibition again with, among others, a Battle of Lepanto.

He returned to Rome for a few months in 1901, where he created a series of pastels featuring historical landmarks. In 1907, he was named an assistant for the Decorative Composition classes at the Escuela de Artes Industriales de Cádiz, and he left his position at Transatlántica. Around 1910, he suffered the loss of an eye. Although he continued to paint, his compositions became simpler and his color scheme faded dramatically.
