= Julia Alcayde y Montoya =

Spanish artist (1885–1939)

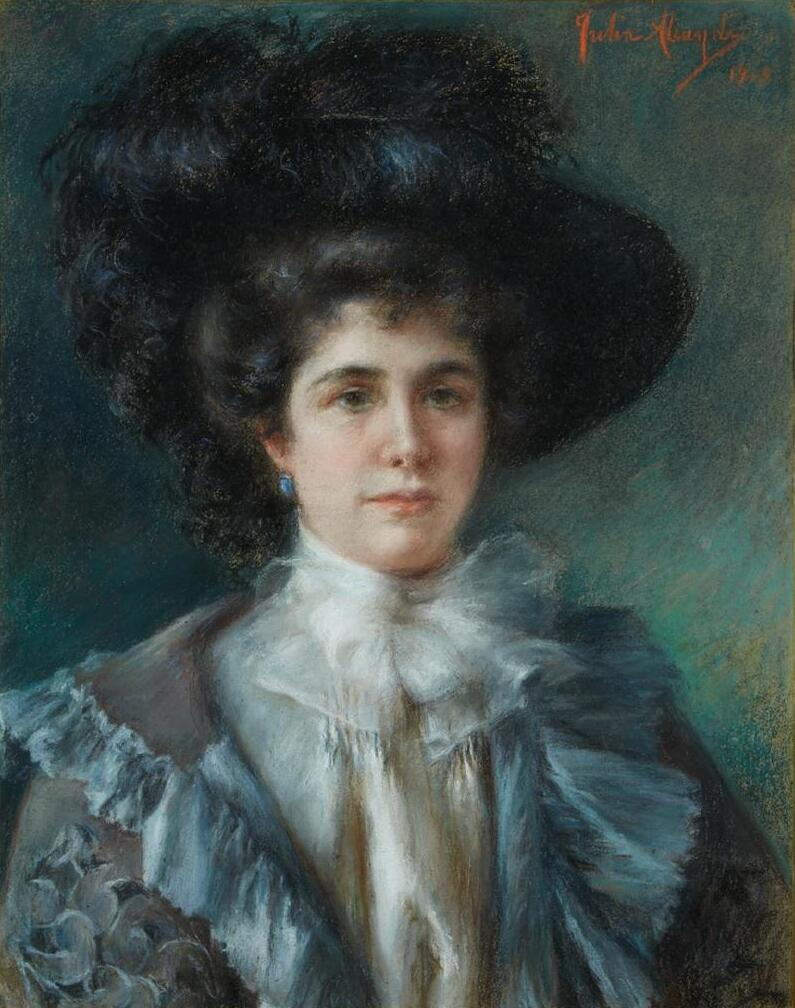
- Self Portrait, 1903
- Born: 1885; Gijón, Spain
- Died: 1939 (aged 53–54); Madrid, Spain
- Known for: Painting

Julia Alcayde y Montoya (1885–1939) was a Spanish painter who specialised in painting still lifes and portraits.

== Biography ==
Alcayde y Montoya was born in 1885 in Gijón. She studied at the Escuelas de Artes y Oficios de España ( School of Arts and Crafts) in Madrid. She exhibited regularly at the Spanish National Exhibition of Fine Arts where she won third place medals in 1892 and 1895, and second place medals in 1899, 1912 and 1920. Alcayde y Montoya exhibited her work at the Palace of Fine Arts and The Woman's Building at the 1893 World's Columbian Exposition in Chicago, Illinois.

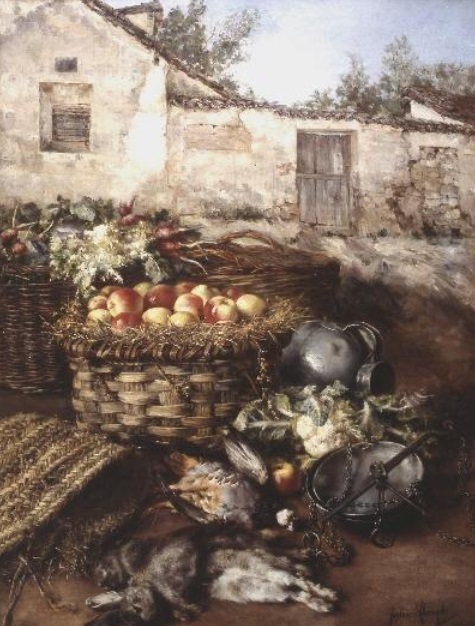
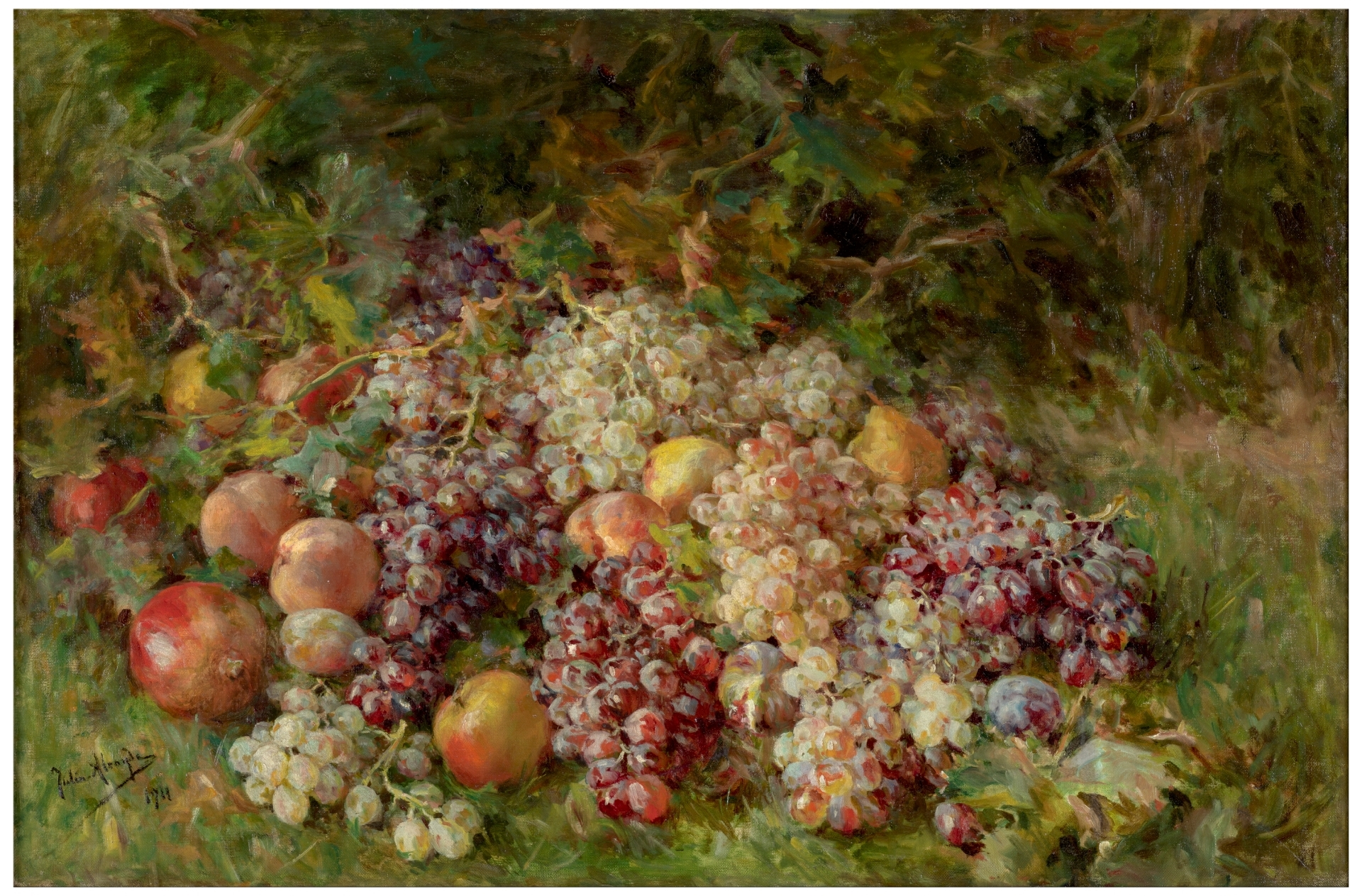
Alcayde y Montoya received second place commendations for The Stall on My Street (left) and Fruits (right) at the Spanish National Exhibition of Fine Arts in 1899 and 1912, respectively.

Alcayde y Montoya died in 1939 in Madrid.

== Gallery ==
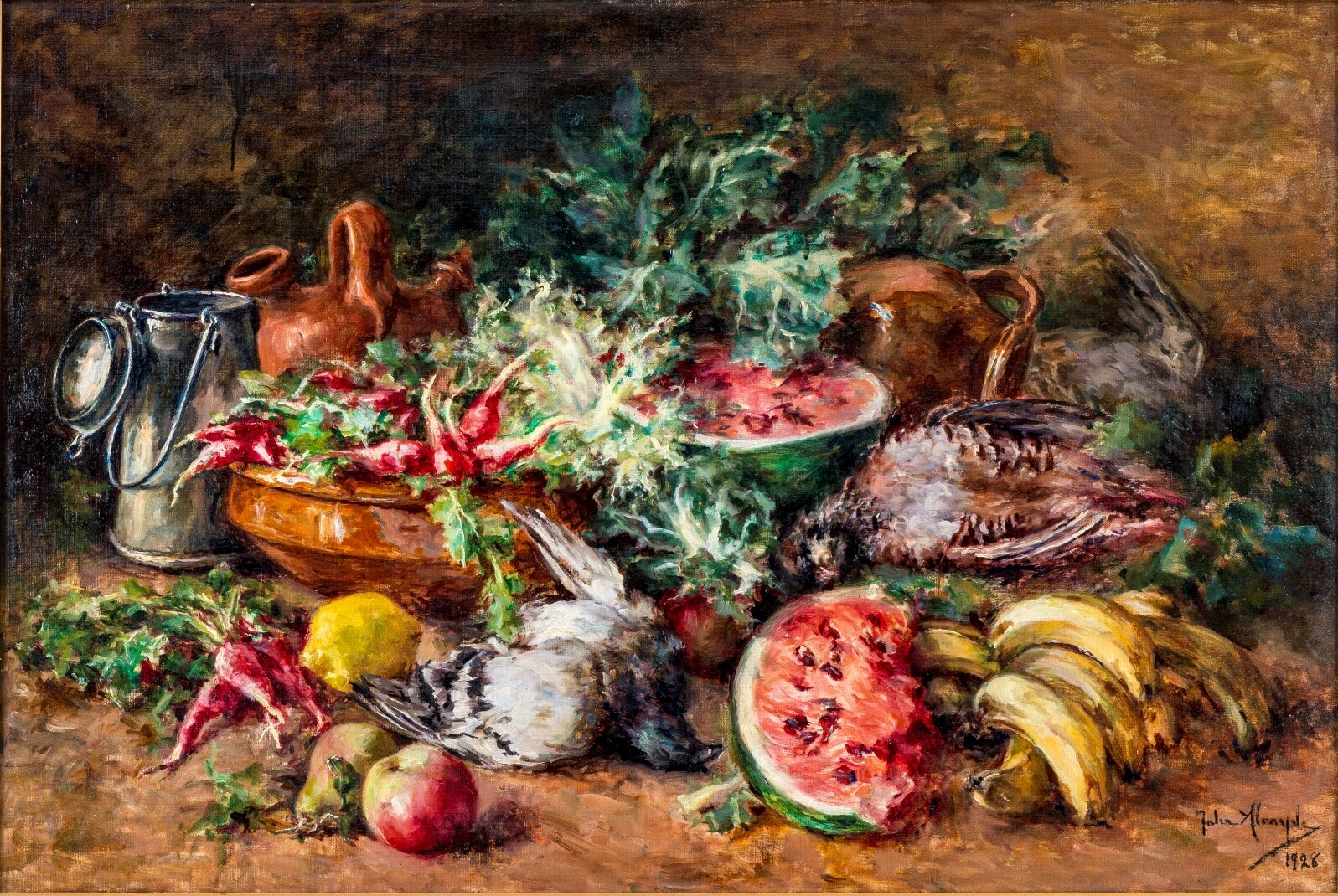
Still Life with Fruit, Vegetables, Birds, Hare and Pitchers, 1926

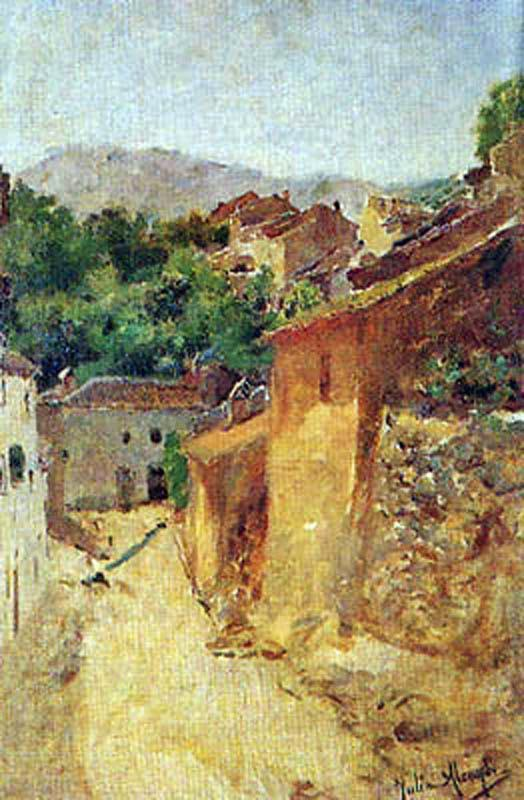
Scenery, c. 20th-century

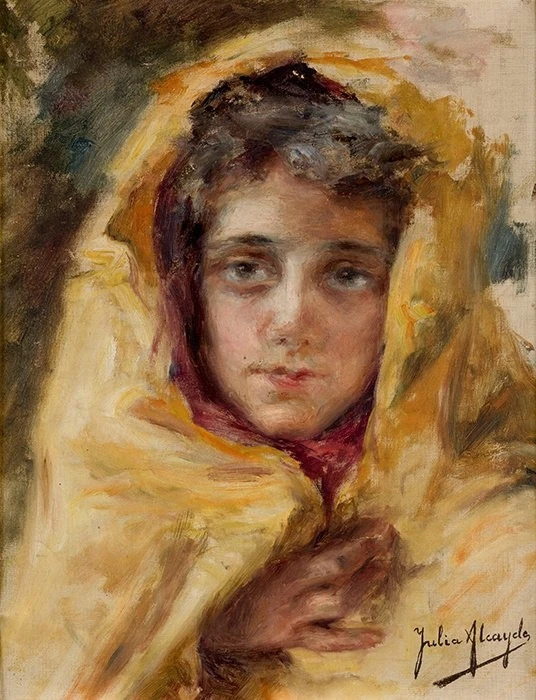
Portrait of Young Man with Yellow Cloak, c. 20th-century
