= Ventura Álvarez Sala =

Spanish painter and illustrator

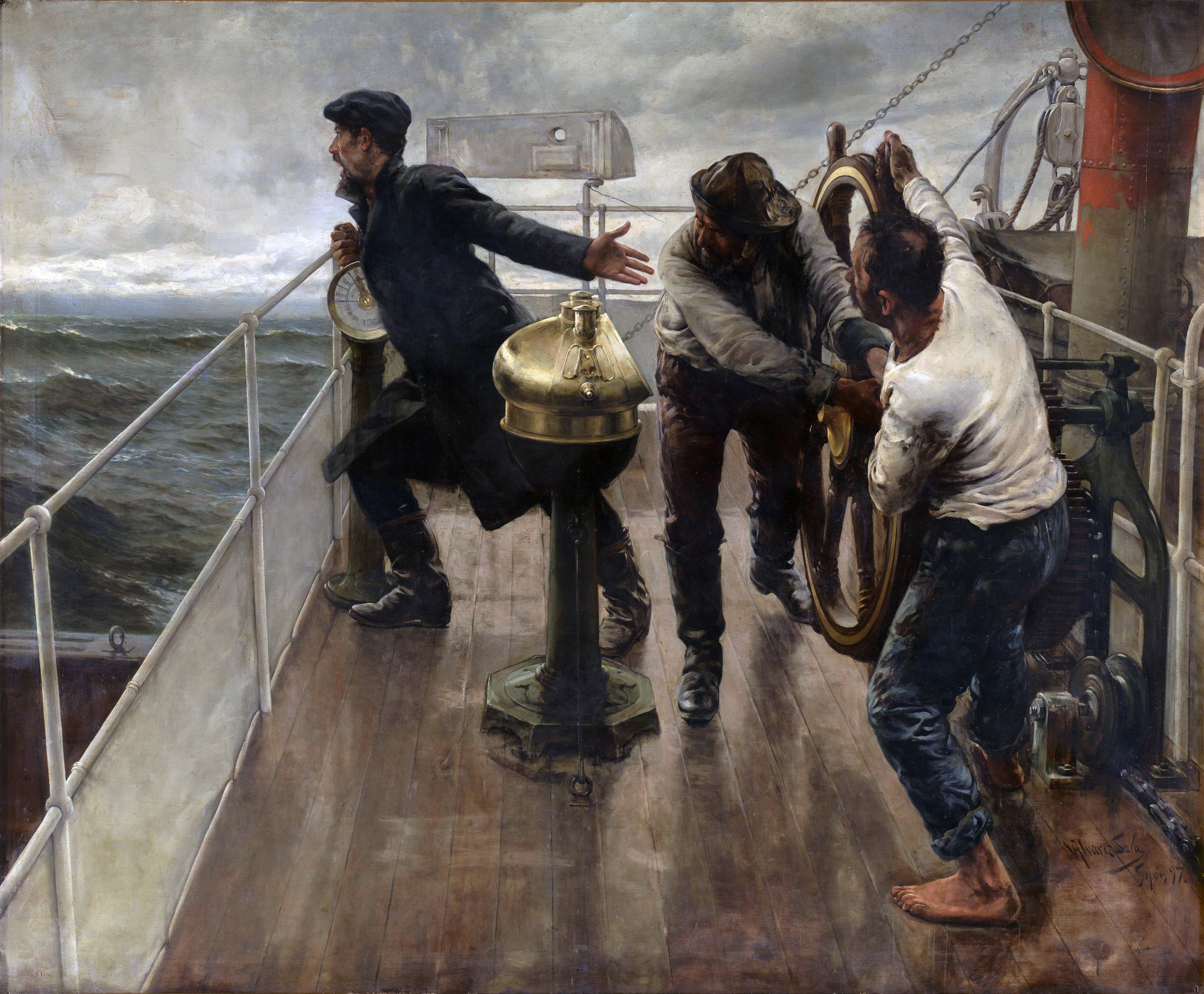
Hard to Port!

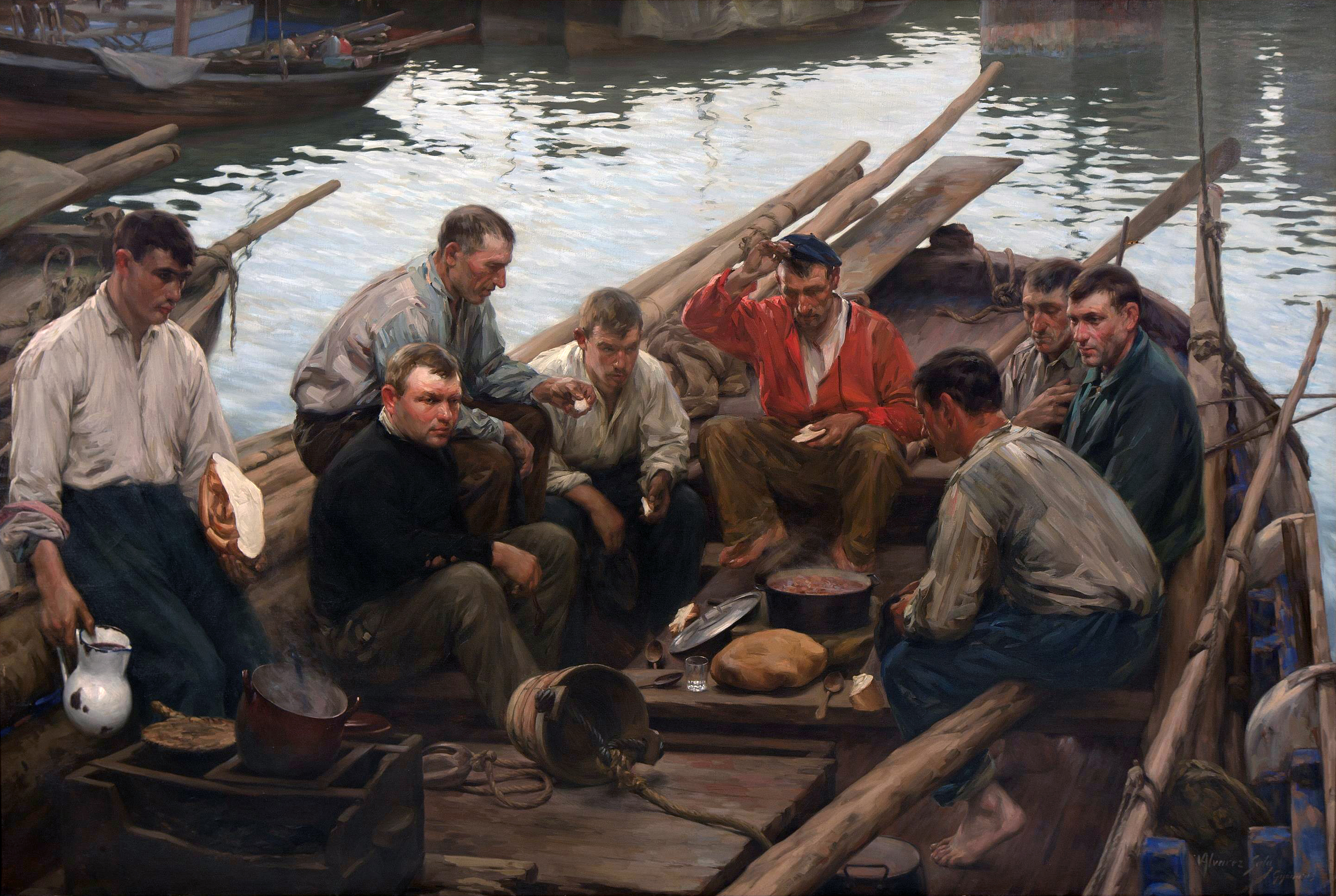
Our Daily Bread

Buenaventura Álvarez Sala Vigil (5 July 1869 – 5 March 1919) was a Spanish painter and illustrator; known for portraits and genre scenes, many involving maritime subjects.

== Biography ==
He was born and died in Gijón. He began his studies at the local drawing school and as an apprentice in the workshops of Dionisio Canal, a decorative painter. In 1890, he moved to Madrid, where he supported himself by making charcoal sketches on demand. Later, he studied with Manuel Ojeda and José Jiménez Aranda at the Escuela Especial de Pintura, Escultura y Grabado, a satellite school of the Real Academia de Bellas Artes de San Fernando.

Beginning in 1892, he was a frequent participant in the National Exhibition of Fine Arts. He received an honorable mention in 1895 for In the Studio. Two years later, he was awarded a Third Class prize for ¡Todo a babor! (Hard to Port!). This was followed in 1899 by another Third Class prize for La rifa de la ternera (The Veal Raffle), During these years, he also provided illustrations for Blanco y Negro.

Thanks to a grant from the Casino de Gijón, he was able to work in Rome. While there, he submitted works for entry in exhibitions back home in Spain, but none received recognition. Upon returning to Gijón, he established a studio in Somió and began participating directly in the National Exhibition again. His work The Promise, submitted in 1904, was purchased by Aureliano de Beruete for display at the Museo de Arte Moderno.

He submitted paintings on Asturian subjects in 1906; 1908, when Emigrants was awarded a Second Class prize; 1910; 1912; and 1915, when he finally achieved a First Class prize for Our Daily Bread.

In addition to his prize-winning works, he is known for portraits that show the influence of Diego Velázquez, and some landscapes. His works may be seen at the Museum of Fine Arts of Asturias and the Museo Jovellanos in Gijón.
