= Manuel Ramírez Ibáñez =

Spanish painter

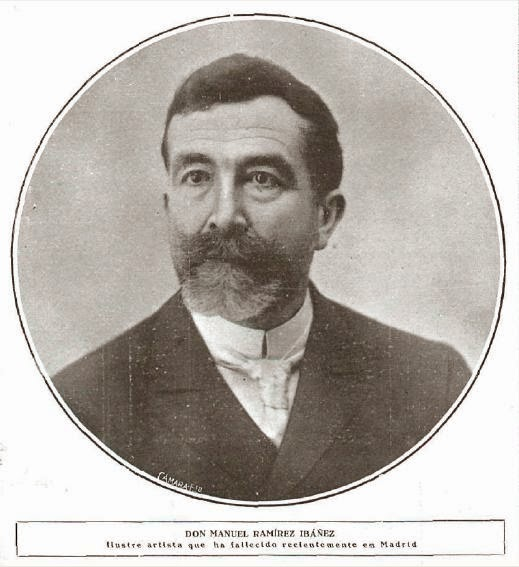
Manuel Ramírez Ibáñez; from his obituary in La Época

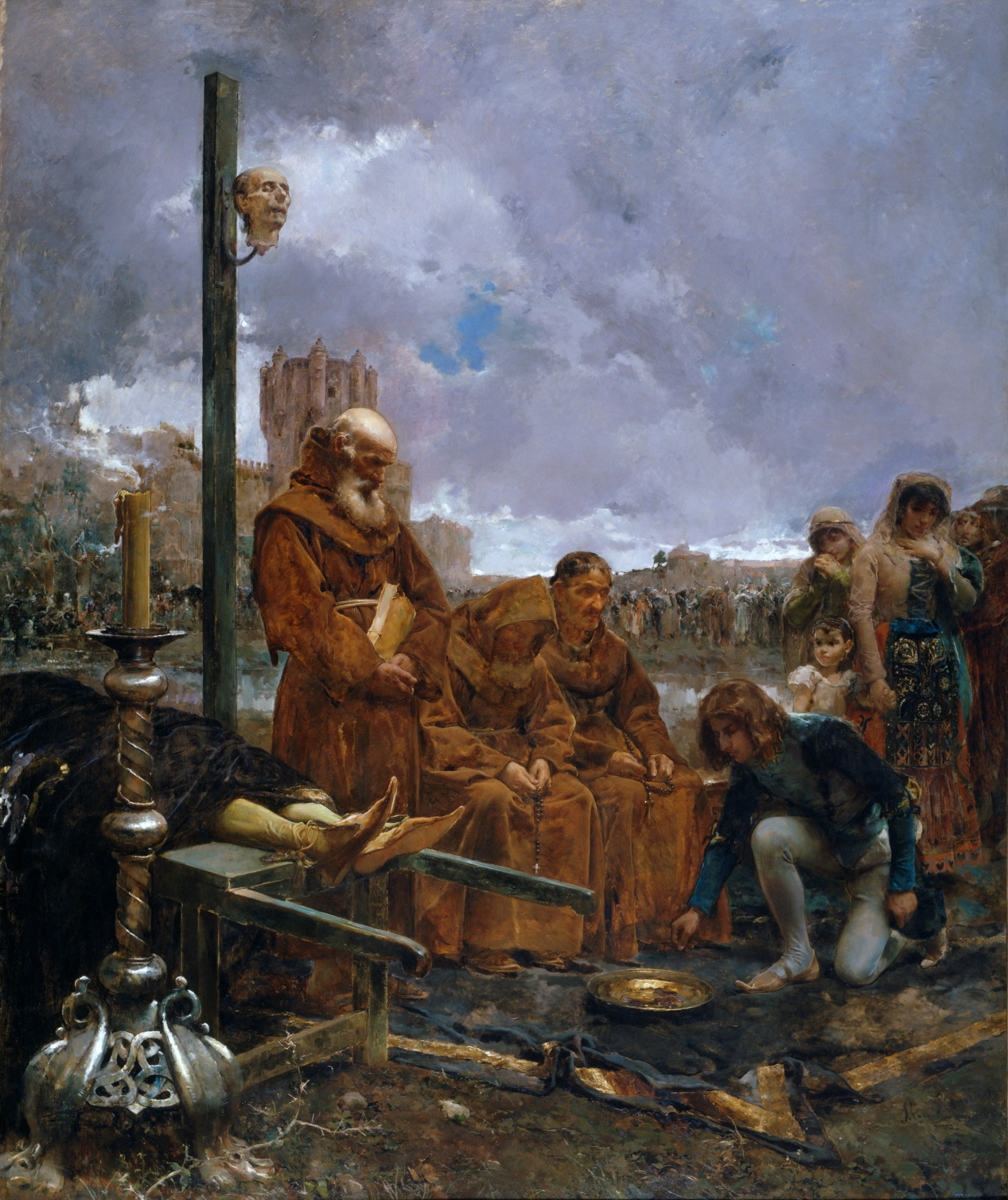
Alms for the Funeral of Don Álvaro de Luna

Manuel Ramírez Ibáñez (21 May 1856 in Arjona – January 1925 in Madrid) was a Spanish painter; primarily known for historical and genre scenes.

== Biography ==
He moved to Madrid at an early age and began his studies at the Real Academia de Bellas Artes de San Fernando.

While studying there, he became a regular participant in the National Exhibition of Fine Arts, presenting two paintings in 1876 and six in 1878, receiving a Third Class prize for his depiction of the death of Francisco Pizarro, based on a version of that event by the poet, Manuel José Quintana. That work was also presented at the Exposition Universelle.

In 1879, he was awarded a scholarship to continue his studies in Rome. His first submission came in 1881, with a classical scene of the Pompeiian baths. In 1883, he completed a monumental canvas; "Alms for the Funeral of Don Álvaro de Luna", which received a Second Class prize at the National Exhibition. In 1892, he was given another Second Class prize for "The Piano Lesson".

He also served as a professor at the School of Arts and Crafts in Madrid. Following the death of José Casado del Alisal, he was commissioned to complete the works Casado had left unfinished at the Basilica of San Francisco el Grande

Finally, in 1910, he was awarded a First Class prize at the National Exhibition for "Before the Class". Three of his paintings were entered there posthumously in 1926. His works may be seen at the Army Museum of Toledo, the art collection of the Diputación de Jaén, and the Museo de Bellas Artes de Badajoz.
