= Alberto Pla y Rubio =

Spanish painter (1867–1937)

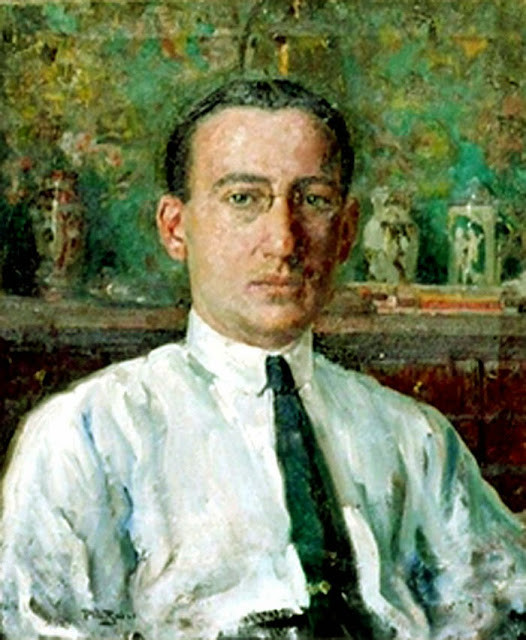
- Self-portrait, 1910.
- Born: 1867; Castelló de la Ribera, Valencia, Spain
- Died: 1937 (aged 69–70); Barcelona, Spain
- Education: Real Academia de Bellas Artes de San Fernando, Madrid, Spain
- Known for: Painting
- Notable work: Off to War! (1895); De la guerra (1897); Girl in a Field (1920)
- Movement: Impressionism

Alberto Pla y Rubio (1867–1937) was a Spanish painter interested in social issues. He was a professor of the Academy of Fine Arts in Valencia, the Academy of Fine Arts in Cadiz and the La Lonja school in Barcelona.

== Biography ==
He was born in Castelló de la Ribera, Province of Valencia. He studied art at the Real Academia de Bellas Artes de San Fernando in Madrid, where he was a pupil of Alejandro Ferrant y Fischermans, and in the workshop of Ignacio Pinazo Camarlench. He won a first-class medal in the National Exhibition of 1895 with a canvas entitled ¡A la guerra! ("Off to War!") and won a second-class medal at the Paris Salon of 1899. He died in Barcelona.

Rubio focused on social themes in a realistic style. He was strongly influenced by Joaquin Sorolla and impressionist brushwork, especially in the use of light in his oil paintings.

His prize-winning painting, ¡A la guerra!, belongs to the Prado, the national art museum of Spain, and currently hangs in the town hall of Alcalá de Henares.

In 2006, his painting The Orange Harvest sold at Christie's for US$16,800 (equivalent to $27,000 in 2025).

== Gallery ==
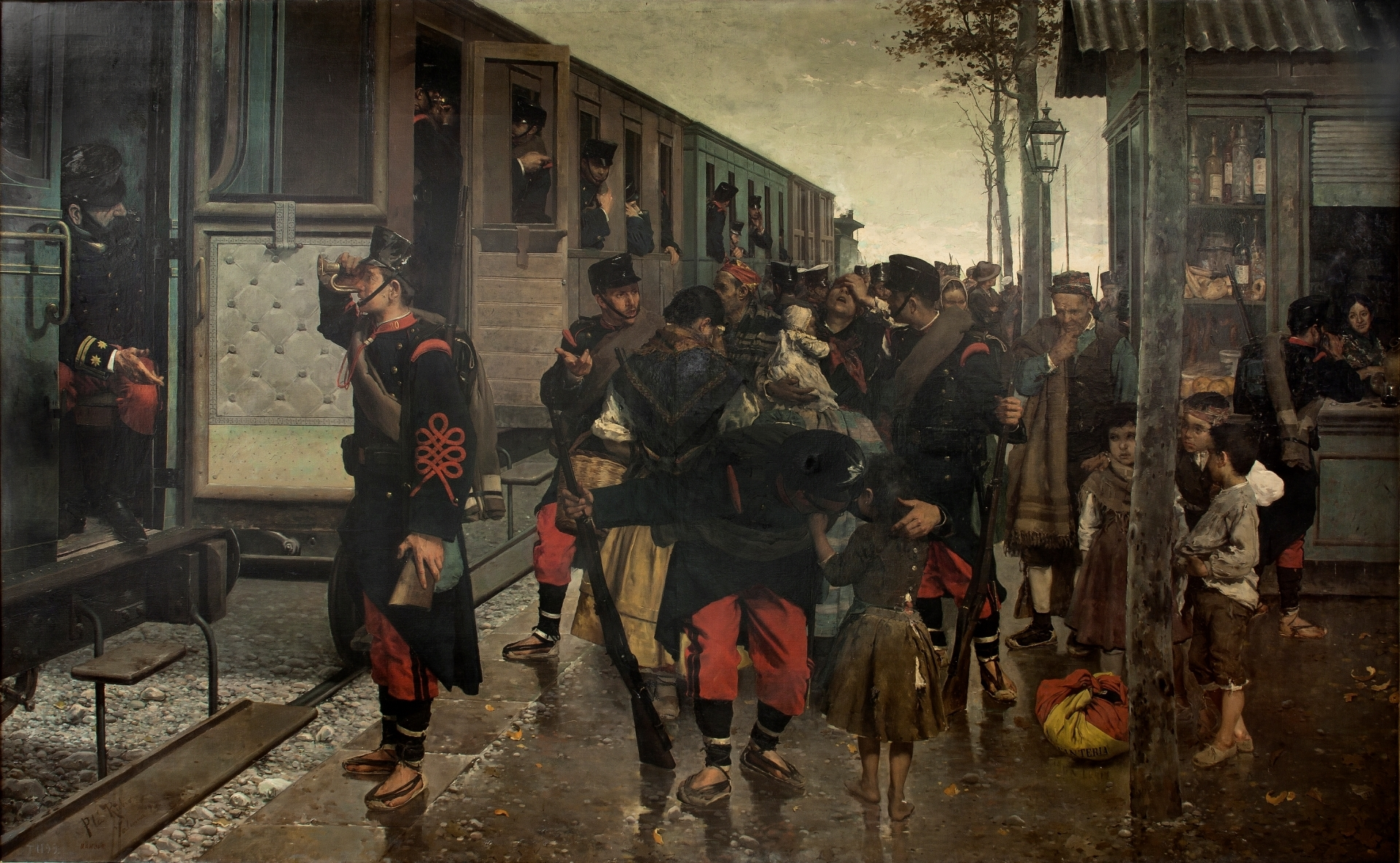
Off to War! (1895)

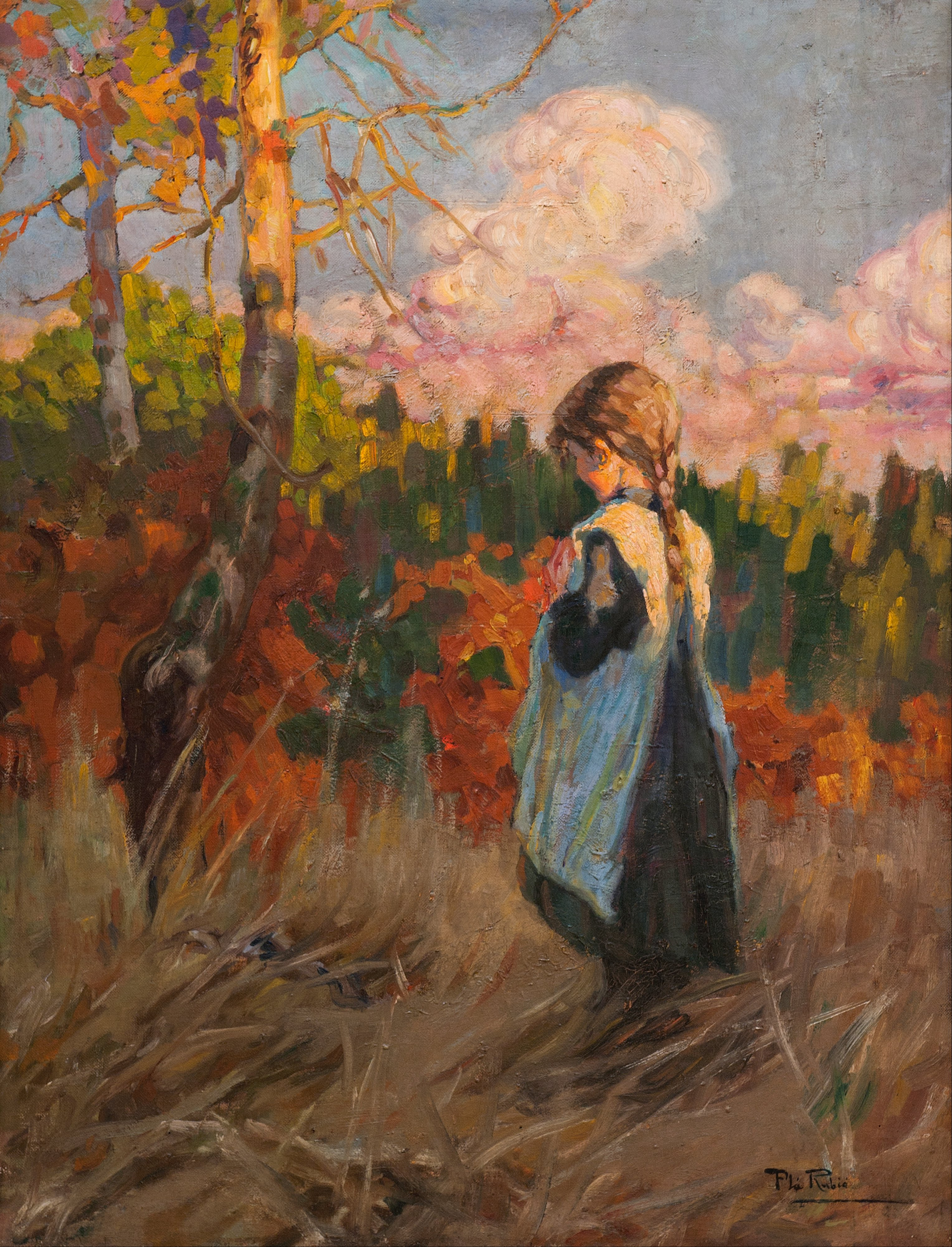
Girl in a Field (1920)

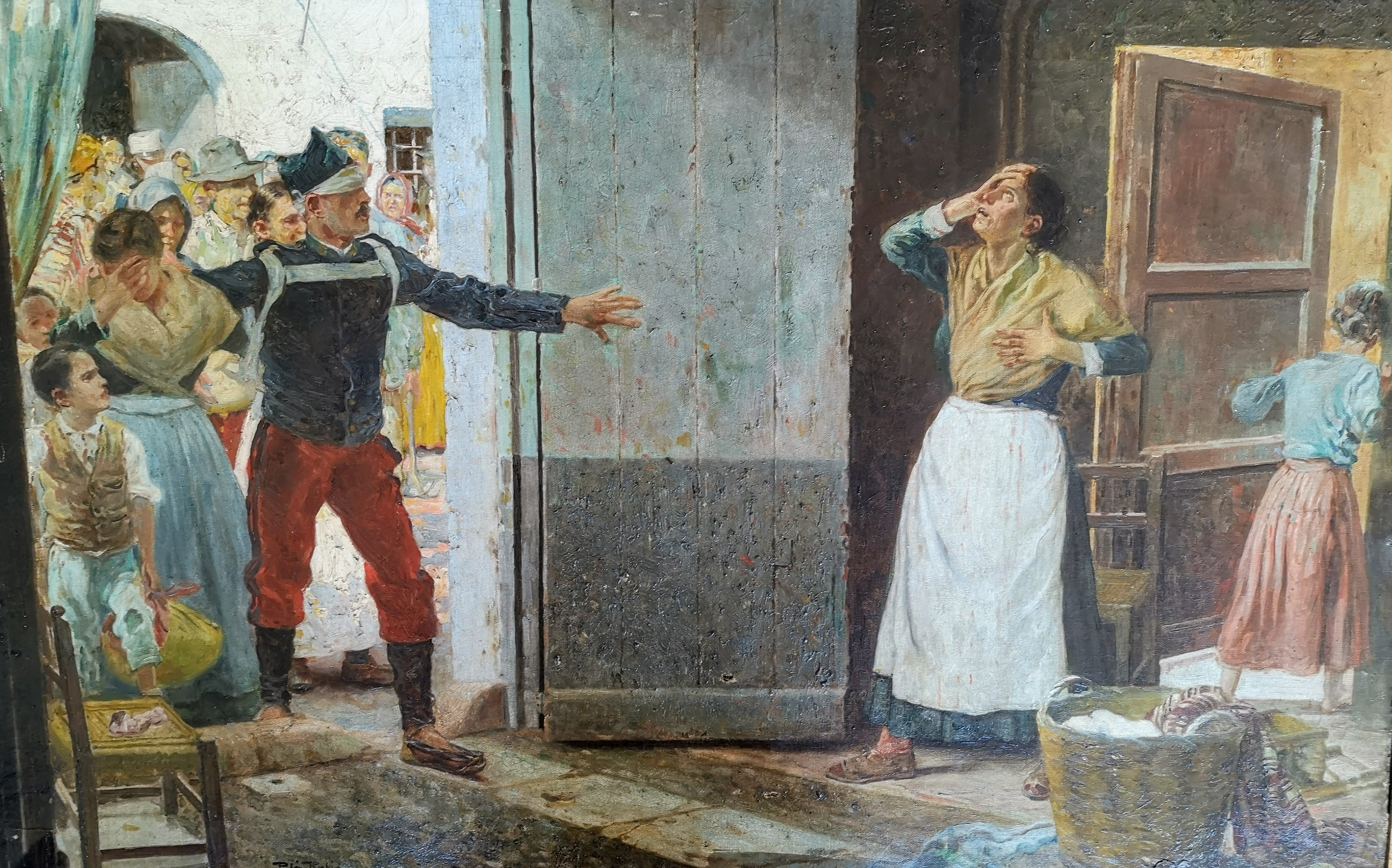
De la Guerra (1897)
