= Francisco Javier Amérigo =

Spanish painter (1842–1912)

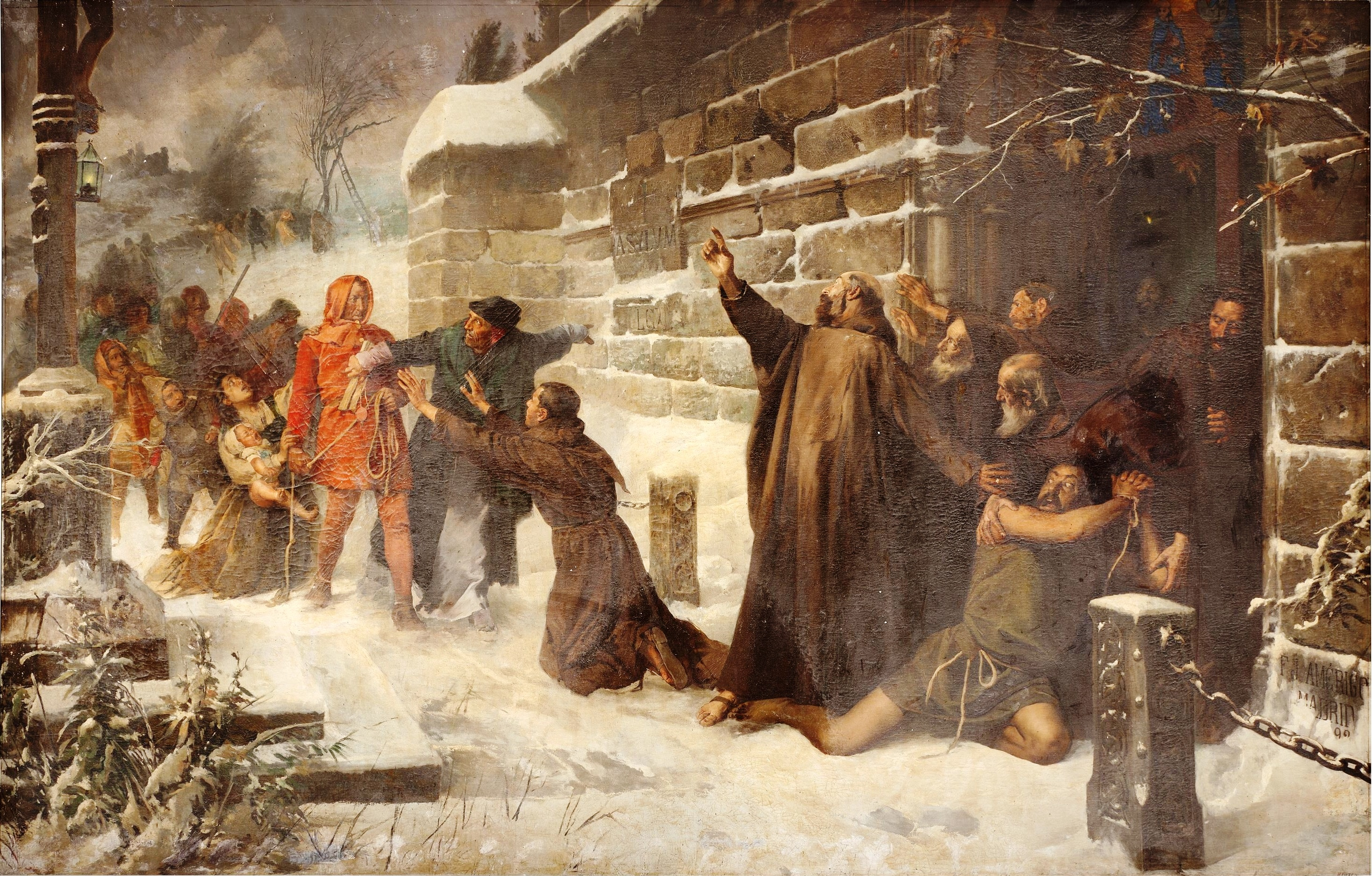
The Right of Asylum (Asilo en sagrado)

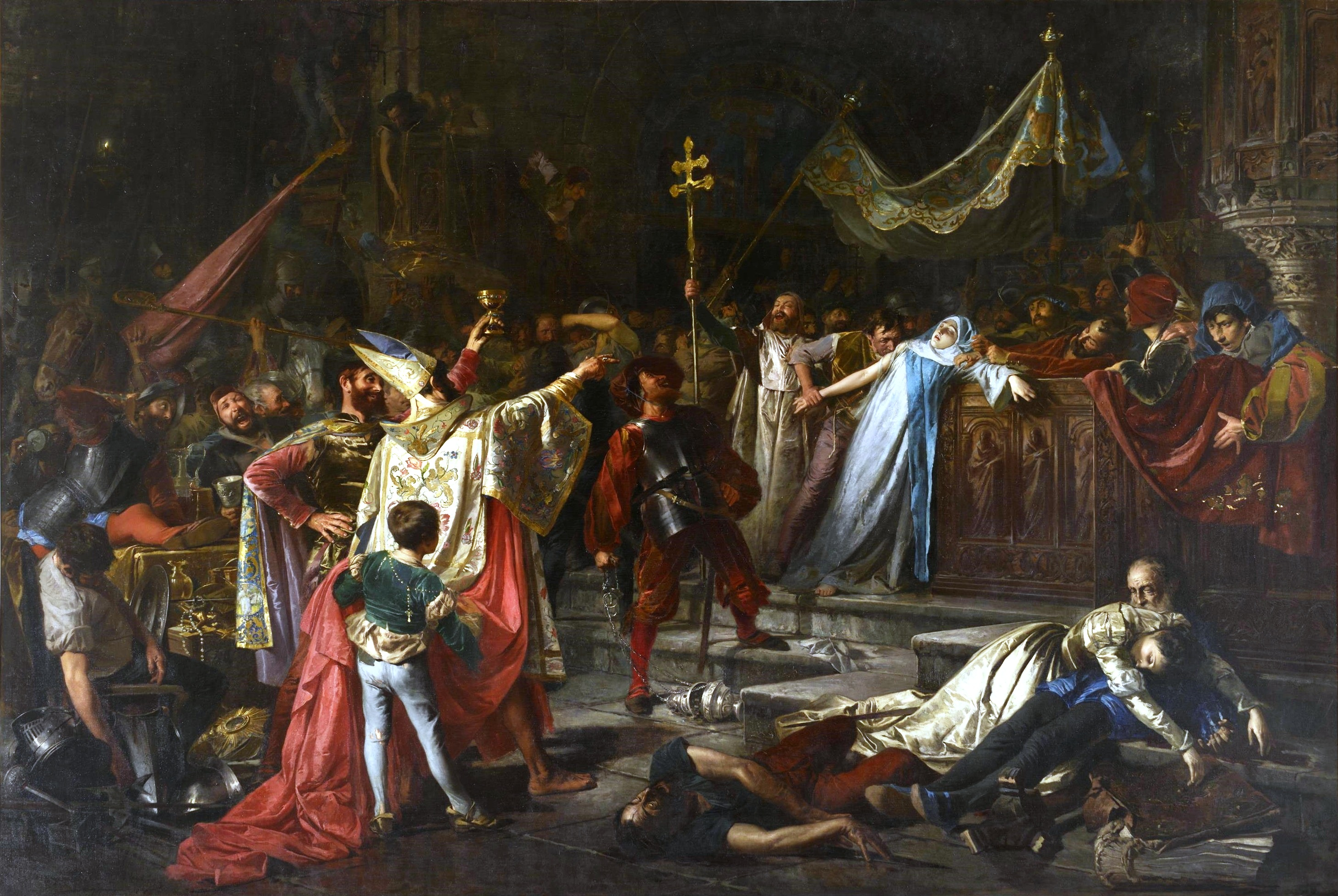
The Sack of Rome

Francisco Javier Amérigo y Aparici (2 June 1842, Valencia - 28 March 1912, Madrid) was a Spanish painter who specialized in historical scenes.

== Biography ==
He began his studies at the Real Academia de Bellas Artes de San Carlos in Valencia, where his primary instructor was Francisco Martínez Yago (the father of Salvador Martínez Cubells, who would become Francisco's best friend). During his time there, he was awarded a medal at an exhibition in Alicante (1860). Later, he attended the Real Academia de Bellas Artes de San Fernando in Madrid.

In 1865, he went to study in Rome. There, he became acquainted with Eduardo Rosales and Mariano Fortuny and would be influenced by their styles. From Rome, in 1876, he submitted his work Good Friday at the Colosseum in Rome, to the National Exhibition of fine Arts, where it was given a Second Class prize.

The following year, he returned to Spain and presented The Sack of Rome, which was awarded a First Prize. This work was dedicated to his friend, the politician and author, Víctor Balaguer, who later made it part of a collection that would become the Biblioteca Museo Víctor Balaguer.

In 1892, he received another First Prize at the National Exhibition for his painting The Right of Asylum.

In addition to historical works, he created religious paintings; notably the ceiling at the Real Basílica de San Francisco el Grande, and designed theatrical settings for the Teatro Martín in Madrid.
