= Zaratán =

Coordinates: 41.660°N 4.784°W

Zaratán, Spain
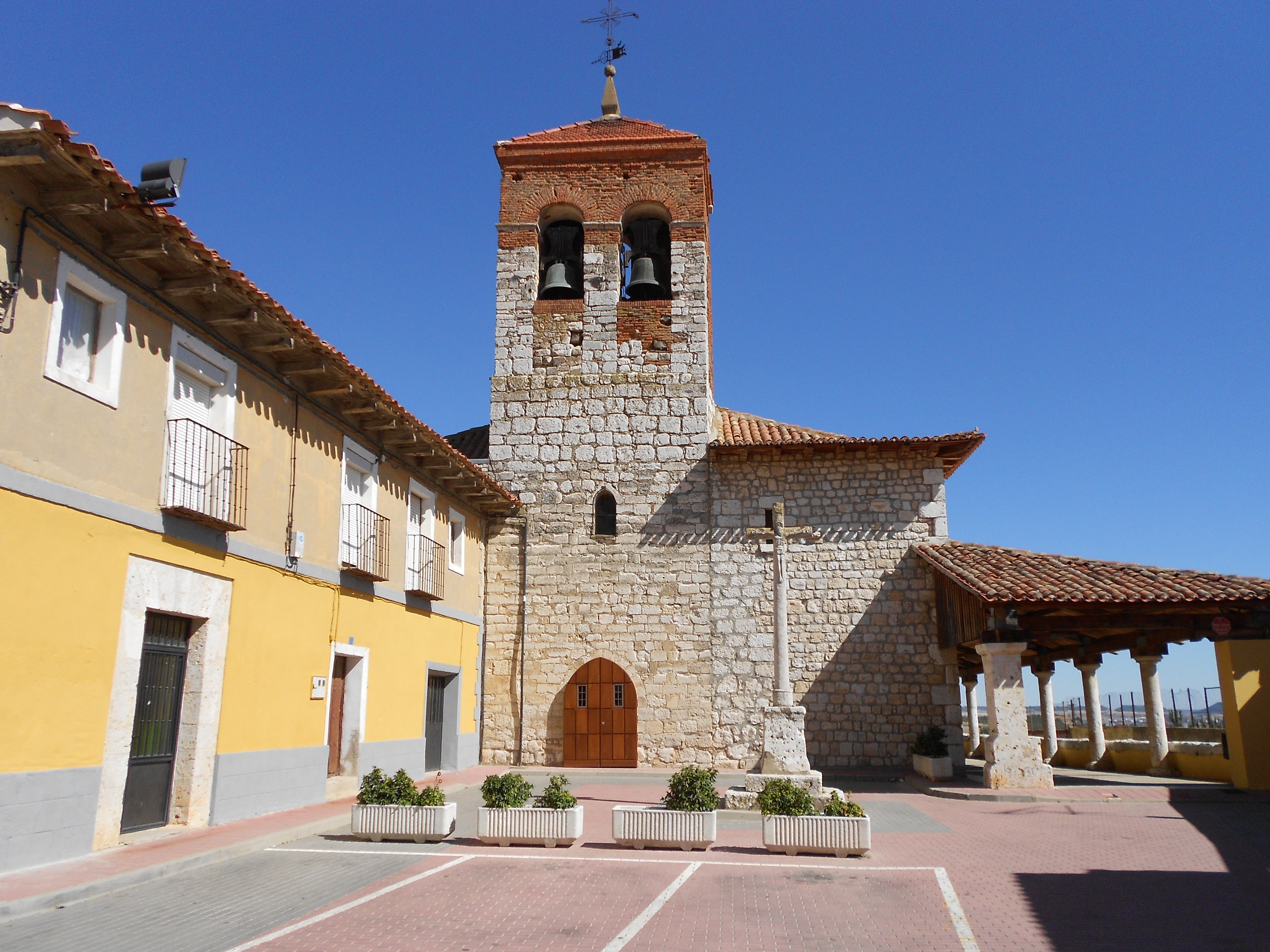
- Church of San Pedro Apostle.

- Flag Coat of arms
- Interactive map of Zaratán, Spain
- Country: Spain
- Autonomous community: Castile and León
- Province: Valladolid
- Municipality: Zaratán

Area
  - Total: 20.22 km^{2} (7.81 sq mi)
- Elevation: 755 m (2,477 ft)

Population (2025-01-01)
  - Total: 6,386
  - Density: 315.8/km^{2} (818.0/sq mi)
- Time zone: UTC+1 (CET)
  - Summer (DST): UTC+2 (CEST)

Zaratán is a municipality located in the province of Valladolid, Castile and León, Spain. According to the 2004 census (INE), the municipality had a population of 2,115 inhabitants.

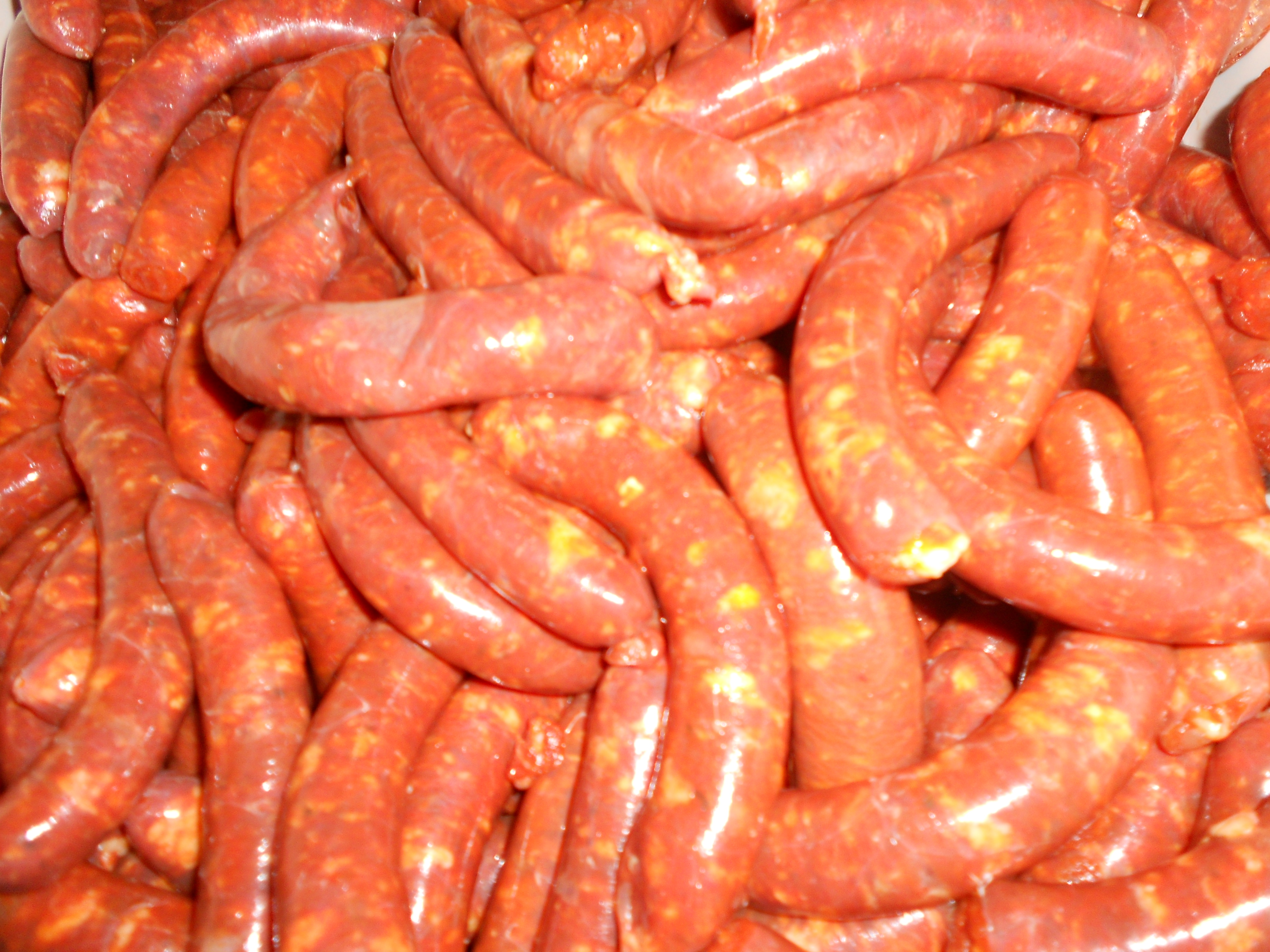
Red and white sausages from Zaratán.

== See also ==
- Cuisine of the province of Valladolid
