= Francisco Peralta del Campo =

Spanish painter (1837–1897)

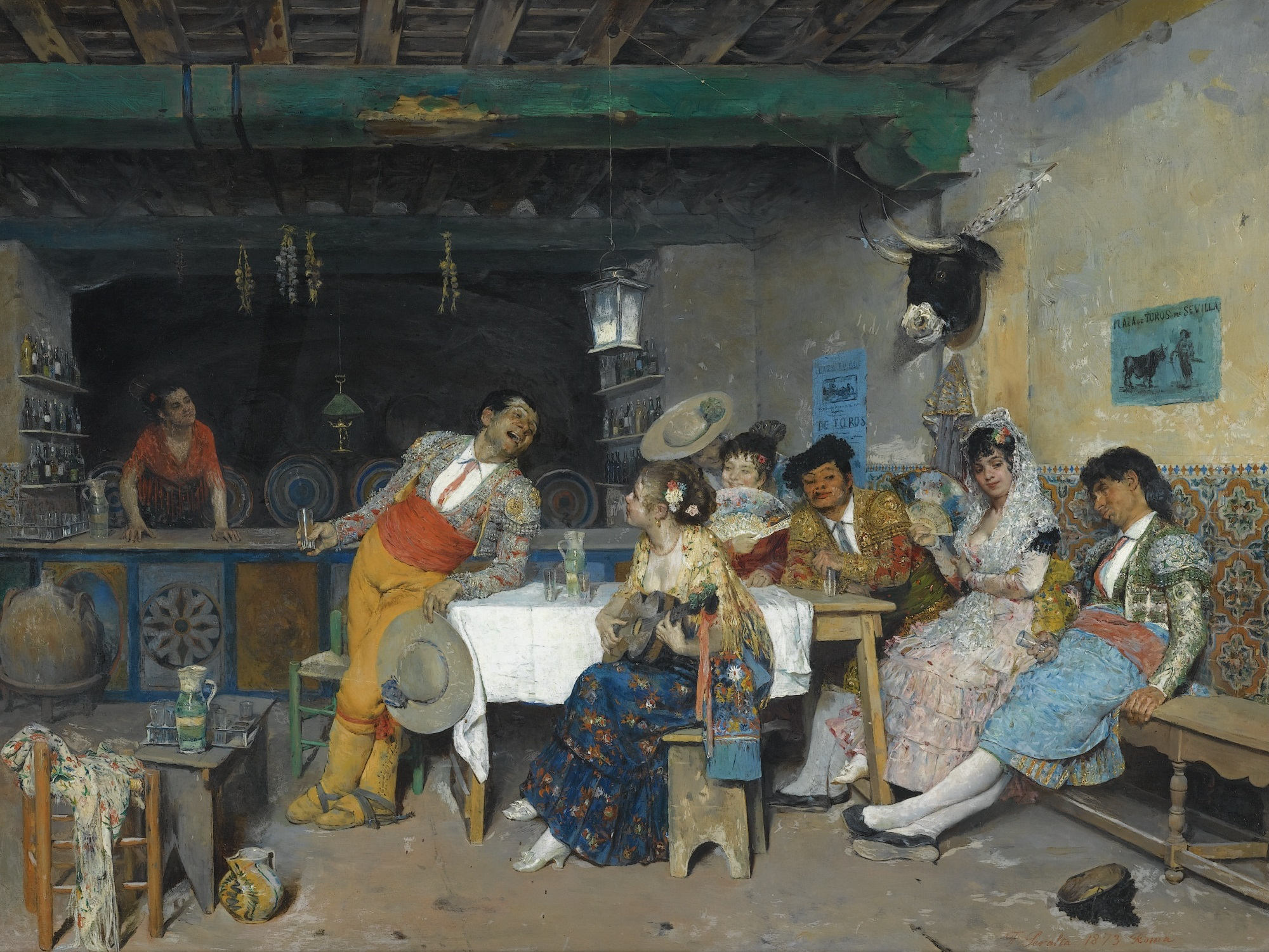
Amusement in the Tavern

Francisco Peralta del Campo (1837–1897) was a Spanish painter now best remembered for his costumbrista and Orientalist scenes.

== Biography ==
He was born in Seville. He began his studies at the Real Academia de Bellas Artes de Santa Isabel de Hungría with Antonio Cabral Bejarano and the history painter, Eduardo Cano.

From 1864 to 1866, he participated in the National Exhibition of Fine Arts with, successively, La Primavera (Spring), Un Frutero (Fruit Seller) and Un pensamiento (Contemplation), obtaining honorable mention.

In 1868, he travelled to Italy, in the company of his fellow Spanish artists, José Villegas Cordero and Luis Jiménez Aranda. He would remain there for the rest of his life; mostly in Rome, although he spent long periods in Venice. Many of his works were "casacones" (small paintings for the home), a very popular genre featuring courtly scenes from the 17th and 18th centuries.

His canvases, Caballero de Casaca (Gentleman in a Jacket) and Retrato de señora con el fondo rojo (Portrait of a Woman with Red Background) may be seen at the Museo del Prado. Another major work, Firma de esponsales (Signing the Engagement Contract), is in the Colección Bellver.

He died in 1897 in Rome.
