= Luis Jiménez Aranda =

Spanish painter (1845–1928)

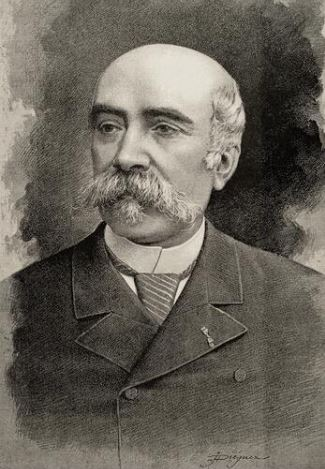
Luis Jiménez Aranda, by J. Dieguez (before 1900)

Luis Jiménez Aranda (21 June 1845, Seville – 1 March 1928, Pontoise) was a Spanish-born French painter of genre scenes; many in costumbrista style. His brothers, José and Manuel also became painters.

== Biography ==
His first art lessons came from his older brother, José, followed by classes at the Real Academia de Bellas Artes de Santa Isabel de Hungría under the direction of Eduardo Cano and Antonio Cabral Bejarano. In 1868, thanks to a four year stipend from a wealthy patron, he went to Rome to see the Old Masters and complete his studies with Marià Fortuny. In return, he had to send back a painting every year. He remained there after his stipend expired, until 1874, sharing a home with his friends, José Villegas Cordero and Francisco Peralta del Campo. They also took classes together from Eduardo Rosales.

At that time, he and his Italian wife Lucia moved to Paris and made the acquaintance of the art dealer, Adolphe Goupil. Two years later, he moved to Pontoise, possibly after going there to meet Camille Pissarro. He would stay there the rest of his life, becoming a naturalized citizen of France in 1877. In the 1880s, he began painting en plein aire in the surrounding countryside.

He participated in exhibits at the Salon and received recognition at the Exposition Universelle (1889). He also had a major showing at the World's Columbian Exposition (1893) in Chicago.

He was a regular participant in the Spain's National Exhibition of Fine Arts, even after settling in France. In 1864, he was given honorable mention there for a depiction of Christopher Columbus presenting his case to Queen Isabella and King Ferdinand, and first prize in 1892 for The Doctor's Visit. He also acted as a sort of correspondent for the Spanish magazine La Ilustración Española y Americana, providing images and commentary on life in France. When the Spanish landscape painter Emilio Sánchez Perrier came to France to study the Barbizon School, Jiménez shared studio and exhibit space with him. Jiménez himself was influenced by the Barbizon style and would come to favor it in his later years.

== Selected paintings ==
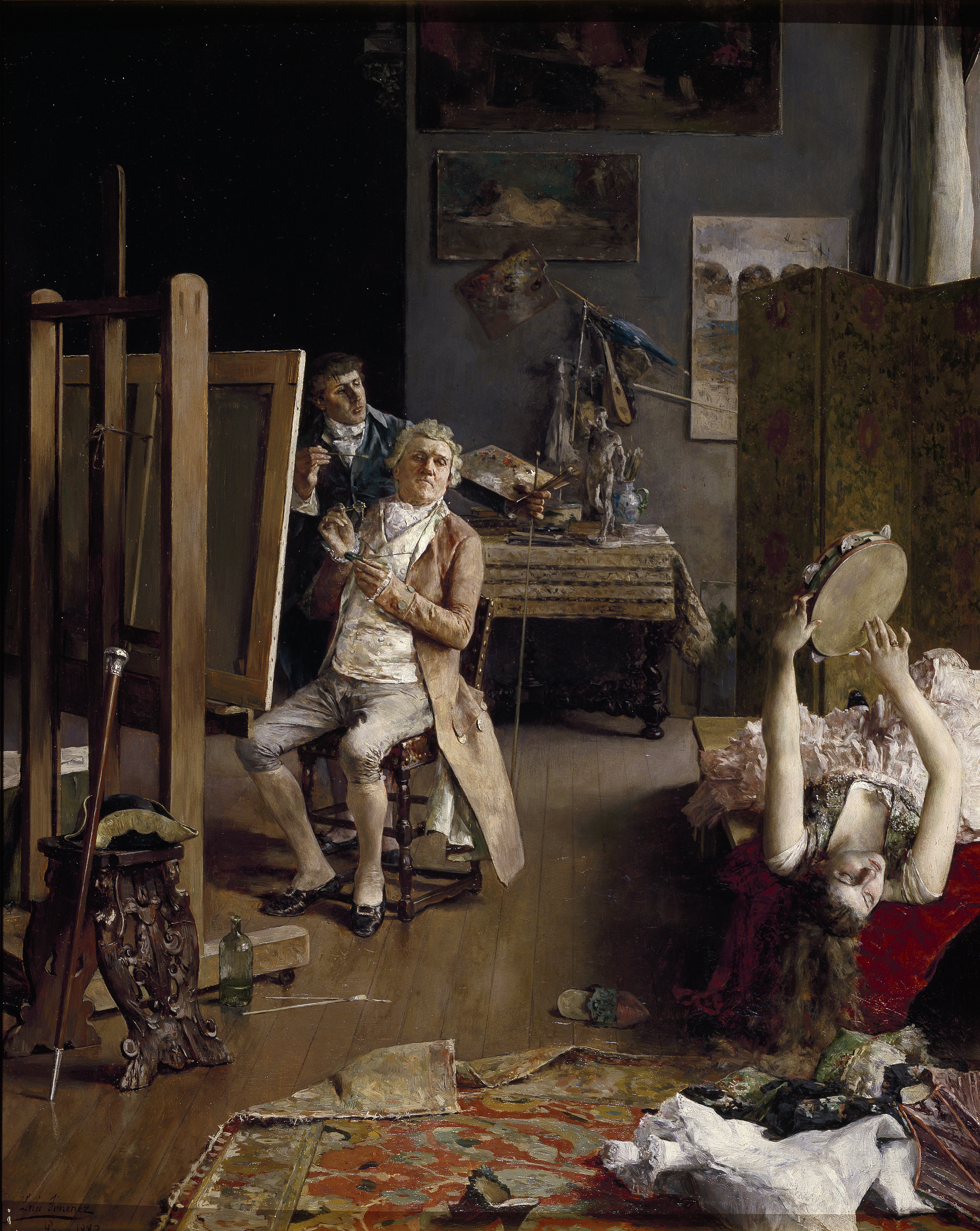
In the Painter's Studio

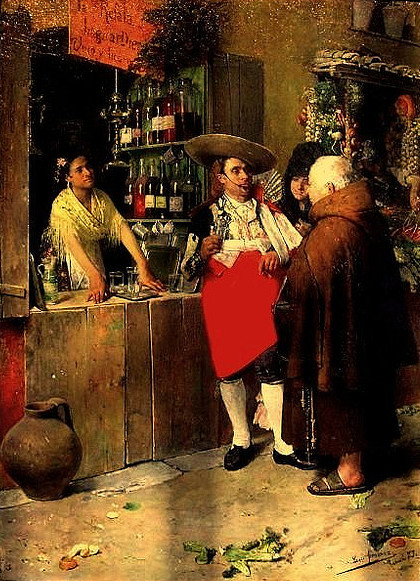
Andalusian Tavern

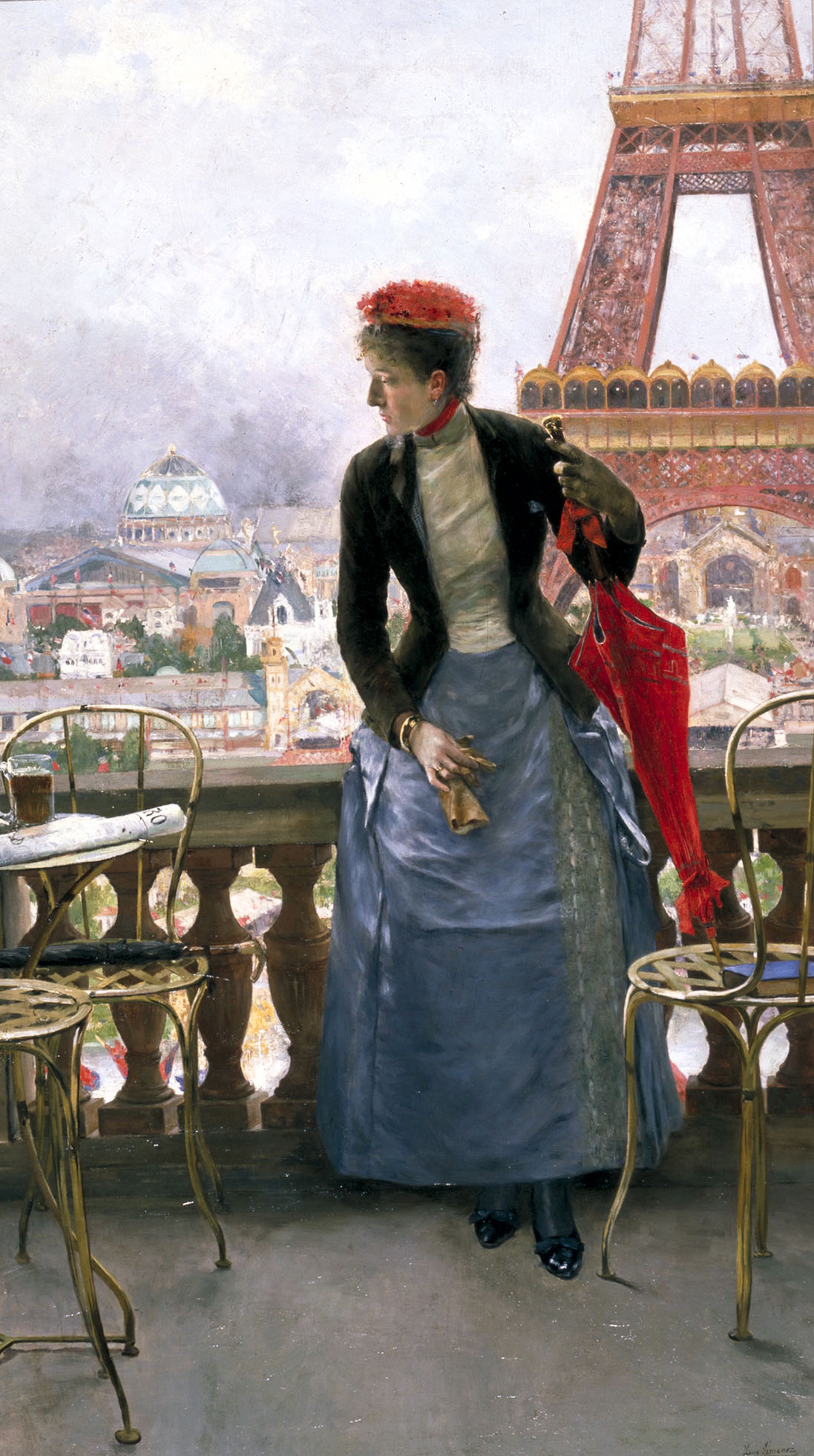
Lady at the World's Fair

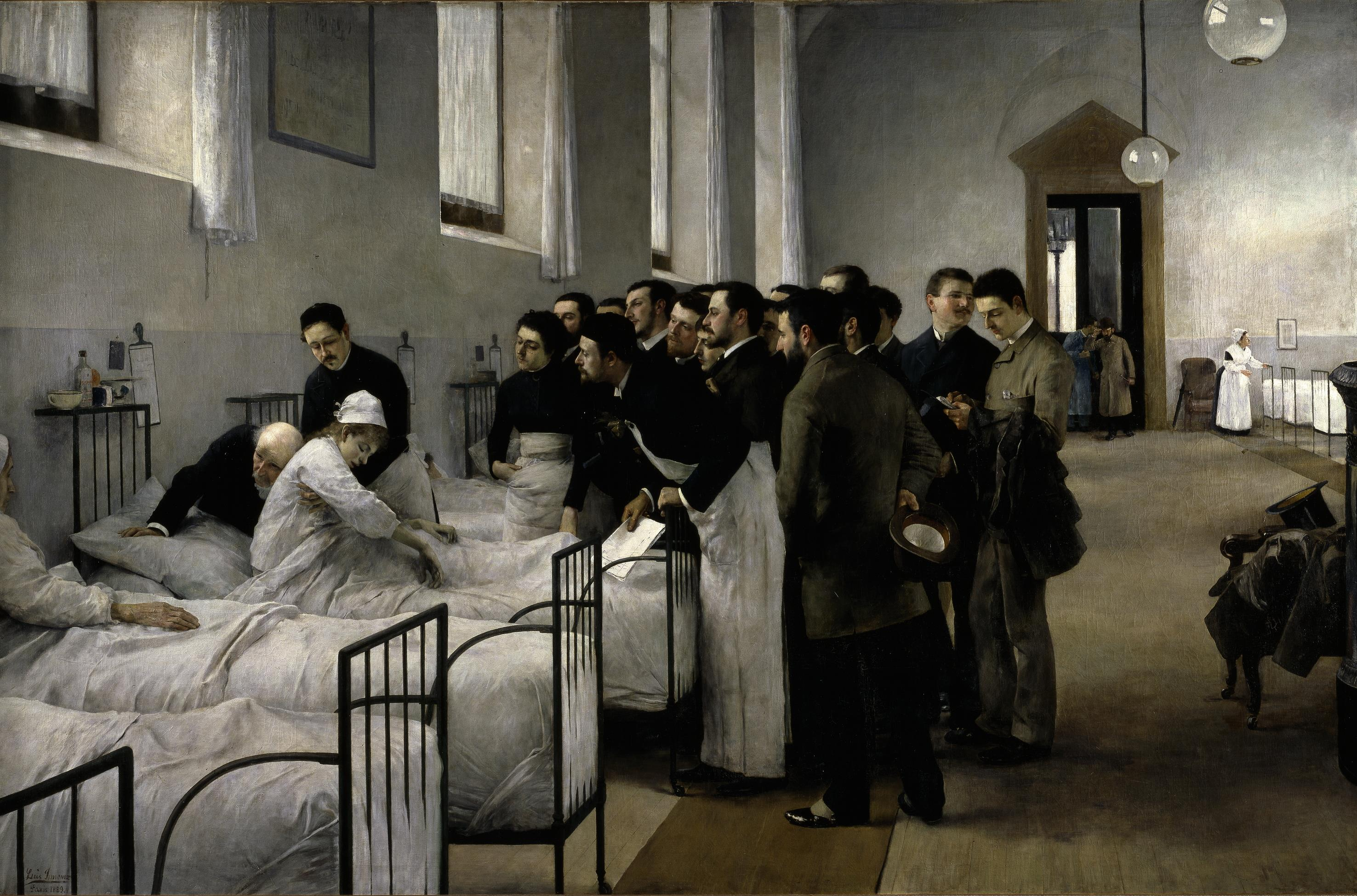
A Ward Being Visited by the
Head of the Hospital (The Doctor's Visit)
