= Carlos Rojas Vila =

Spanish writer (1928–2020)

Carlos Rojas Vila (12 August 1928 – 9 February 2020) was a Spanish author, academic, and artist born in Barcelona in 1928. His father was Carlos Rojas Pinilla, a Colombian doctor, who was in turn the younger brother of Gustavo Rojas Pinilla, the 19th president of Colombia. He attended the University of Barcelona, obtaining his undergraduate degree in 1951. He earned his doctorate in 1955 from the University of Madrid with a study on Richard Ford. In 1960 he began teaching at Emory University in Atlanta, Georgia, where he led a distinguished career until his retirement in 1996.

He wrote both non-fiction and fiction, winning awards in both categories. His first novel De barro y esperanza appeared in 1957. In 1959, he was awarded the Ciudad de Barcelona prize for his work, El asesino de César.. He received the Premio Selecciones de Lengua Española for his 1963 work La ternura del hombre invisible, this was followed in 1968 by the Premio Nacional de Literatura "Miguel Cervantes" for the novel Auto de Fe. The Premio Planeta de Novela was awarded to him in 1973 for his biographical novel Azaña, four years later, in 1977, he won the Premio Ateneo de Sevilla for Memorias inéditas de José Antonio Primo de Ribera. His 1979 work El Ingenioso hidalgo y poeta Federico García Lorca asciende a los infiernos won the Premio Nadal, and in 1984 he was awarded the Premio Espejo de España for El mundo mítico y mágico de Pablo Picasso. These last works are all fictionalized biographies, a genre of which he was particularly fond.

His writing has been translated into English, French, German, Hungarian, and several Slavic languages

== Works ==
- 1957 De barro y esperanza (novela)
- 1958 El futuro ha comenzado (novela)
- 1959 El asesino de César (novela)
- 1963 La ternura del hombre invisible
- 1965 Adolfo Hitler está en mi casa (novela)
- 1965 De Cela a Castillo-Navarro: veinte an̈os de prosa española contemporánea (antología)
- 1966 Diálogos para otra España (ensayo)
- 1966 Rei de Roma (en catalán)
- (1967-1969) Maestros Norteamericanos (ensayo)
- 1968 Auto de Fe (novela)
- 1969 El aprendizaje de los sueños en la pintura de Pepi Sánchez (ensayo)
- 1970 Aquelarre (ensayo)
- 1970 ¿Por qué perdimos la guerra? (ensayo)
- 1970 Luis III, el Minotauro
- 1970 Unamuno y Ortega: Intelectuales frente al drama (ensayo)
- 1972 Las llaves del infierno
- 1973 Diez figuras ante la guerra civil (ensayo)
- 1973 Azaña (novela biográfica) Premio Planeta
- 1975 La guerra civil vista por los exiliados (ensayo)
- 1975 Mein Fuehrer, mein Fuehrer! (el libro prohibido) (novela)
- 1977 Memorias inéditas de José Antonio Primo de Rivera (novela biográfica)
- 1977 Azaña / Companys: los dos presidentes (biografía)
- 1977 Machado y Picasso: arte y muerte en el exilio (ensayo)
- 1977 Retratos antifranquistas (biografías)
- 1977 Prieto y José Antonio: socialismo y Falange ante la tragedia civil (ensayo)
- 1978 El valle de los caídos (novela)
- 1979 El Ingenioso hidalgo y poeta Federico García Lorca asciende a los infiernos (novela biográfica) Premio Nadal
- 1979 Guerra de Cataluña
- 1981 La Barcelona de Picasso (ensayo)
- 1984 El mundo mítico y mágico de Picasso (ensayo)
- 1985 El mundo mágico y mítico de Salvador Dalí (ensayo)
- 1988 El jardín de las Hespérides (novela)
- 1990 El jardín de Atocha (novela)
- 1990 Yo Goya (ensayo)
- 1992 Proceso a Godoy (novela histórica)
- 1995 ¡Muera la inteligencia! ¡Viva la muerte! Salamanca, 1936. (ensayo)
- 1995 Alfonso XII de España habla con el demonio (novela)
- 1997 Los Borbones destronados: la biografía humana y política de Carlos IV de España, Fernando VII, Isabel II de España y Alfonso XIII, cuatro monarcas destronados en menos de siglo y medio, pero cuya dinastía recupera siempre la Corona (ensayo)
- 1999 La vida y la época de Carlos IV de España (novela histórica)
- 2000 Puñeta, la Españeta (ensayo)
- 2000 Momentos estelares de la guerra de España (ensayo)
- 2003 Diez crisis del franquismo (ensayo)
