= Andrés Rossi =

Spanish artist and writer

Andres Rossi (Madrid, 1771 - Seville, 1849) was a Spanish artist. He worked as a painter, draughtsman, print maker, sculptor and writer in Madrid and Seville.

== Biography ==
Jose Andres Rossi was born in Madrid. His surname appears as Rossi, Rosi, Roszi, Roso or Rosso in different texts. The fact that he signed with a double "s" suggests an Italian ancestry (though it was often subsequently changed to "Rosi" in the inscriptions of many of his prints).

Rossi attended the Royal Academy of Fine Arts of San Fernando in Madrid. In 1799 he placed second in the Academy's yearly competition with his drawing of Publio Furio Filo. He is described as a patriot of the "Dos de Mayo Uprising". During the Peninsular War he moved to Seville fleeing from the French.

Rossi wrote to King Ferdinand VII twice asking to be considered for a position as a Court painter. His request was ignored both times.

In Seville he taught Fine Arts in addition to pursuing his own career as an artist_{;} In 1814 he was named "Lieutenant Director of Painting" in the Royal Academy of the Three Noble Arts (now known as the Royal Academy of Fine Arts), where he also lectured. Rossi trained artists such as Juan Pérez de Villamayor when he arrived in Seville in 1825. In 1829 his role as Lieutenant Director was re-confirmed. In 1835 was asked to join a commission to catalogue art pieces that would be used to create a new museum in Seville along with Juan de Astorga and José Domínguez Becquer, among others.

In 1841, by order of Queen Isabell II (then under Espartero's regency), he also carried out an inventory of paintings from the Academy of the Three Noble Arts. In 1845 he joined the sculpture department in the same academy, along with Juan de Astorga and Jose Maria Gutierrez.

== Work ==
Andres Rossi was a distinguished print maker. His work is generally centred around biblical, military and classical themes, though he was also inspired by other current affairs of the time in prints such as Justice executed on Pedro Piñero aka El Maragato.

His patriotic feelings during the Peninsular War are reflected in prints such as Atrocious murders of Spaniards in 'Prado de Madrid.

His print named Cornelia at the Duke's feet can be found in the Museo del Prado, where his print, Allegory of painting, was also shown as part of an exhibition named Spanish drawings from the Hamburger Kunsthalle: Cano, Murillo and Goya.

His print named Lady drawing, an exceptional theme as the arts were very restricted to women at the time, can be found at the Museum of Romanticism in Madrid.

In addition to his prints, two of his oil paintings have been preserved; a still life, signed "Andrés Rossi, the Spaniard" and a religious altarpiece which can be found in the church of El Santo Ángel in Seville.

In 1820 he started writing a treaty which he titled; Spirit of Perspective or Elementary Treaty of Perspective for Artists. The original document is kept in the Museum of Romanticism in Madrid.

Furthermore, his contribution to sculpture has also been recorded; the sculpture of Saint Veronica from the El Valle brotherhood paso in Seville has been attributed to him. It was carved in 1815. The original drawing can be found in the Museum of Romanticism in Madrid. The Three Marys from the same paso are attributed to Juan Bautista Patroni.

Rossi, along with Francisco Alcántara and Antonio Rodríguez, presented the Sancha publishing house with series of illustrations for the publication of Cervantes' Persiles and Sigismunda. However, their offer was rejected and José Antonio Ximeno y Carrera's designs were used instead.

In 1830 he took part in the renovation of the Alcázar of Seville gardens where he painted mythological scenes in the gallery. The paintings represented scenes from Virgil's Aeneid and Theseus in front of the labyrinth.

He also took part in the renovation of the Museum square as the art director. This renovation was carried out to celebrate the Queen's wedding.

== Timeline of his work ==
- A man (1790-184-?) Spanish National Library
- S. R. S. Fernando (17??) Spanish National Library
- Saint Isidoro, Archbishop of Seville (1799) Spanish National Library
- Meeting of pilgrims (1802), engraved by M. Alvarez. Spanish National Library
- Street fight (1802), engraved by M. Alvarez. Spanish National Library
- Justice executed on Pedro Piñero aka El Maragato (18??) Spanish National Library
- Drawing of Persiles and Sigismunda (1802) Spanish National Library
- Auristela finds Persiles (1802) Spanish National Library
- Persiles flees from Hipolita's house (1802) Spanish National Library
- Cornelia at the Duke's feet (1810), copy of an original painting by Luis Paret y Alcázar, engraved by Manuel Salvador Carmona. Museo del Prado
- The Generous Lover (1810) engraved by Albuerne. Spanish National Library
- The Jealous Man From Extremadura (1810) engraved by Albuerne. Spanish National Library
- The Lawyer of Glass (1810) engraved by Albuerne. Spanish National Library
- The Gypsy Girl (1810) engraved by Albuerne. Spanish National Library
- The English/Spanish Lady (1810) engraved by Albuerne. Spanish National Library
- The Power of Blood (1810) engraved by Albuerne. Spanish National Library
- The Illustrious Kitchen-Maid (1810) engraved by Albuerne. Spanish National Library
- Two Damsels (1810) engraved by Albuerne. Spanish National Library
- Rinconete and Cortadillo (1810) engraved by Albuerne. Spanish National Library
- Fifty years (1814 ) Spanish National Library
- Sixty years (1814) Spanish National Library
- Eighty years (1814) Spanish National Library
- Ninety years (1814) Spanish National Library
- Angelica's tears (18??) Biblioteca Digital Memoria de Madrid
- Allegory of painting (18??) Museo del Prado
- Still life (18??) oil on canvas.
- Atrocious murders of Spaniards in 'Prado de Madrid' (18??) National Museum of Archaeology, Madrid.
- Captain Pedro Caro y Sureda. Marquis of Romana (18??) engraved by Juan Rodriguez. Spanish National Library
- Portrait of Martín de la Carrera (18??) engraved by Juan Rodriguez. Spanish National Library
- Colloquium of the dogs (18??) engraved by Esteve. Spanish National Library
- Portrait of Ferdinand VII (18??) Spanish National Library
- Return of Ferdinand VII (between 1813 and 1815) copy of an original painting by José María Bonifaz. Spanish National Library
- The horrifying attack on Cádiz (between 1813 and 1815) copy of an original painting by José María Bonifaz. Spanish National Library
- Saint Veronica sculpture for the El Valle brotherhood (1815), Seville.
- El duque de Rivas
- Religious altarpiece (1818), for the church of El Santo Ángel, Seville.
- Lady drawing (1818) Museum of Romanticism, Madrid.
- Spirit of Perspective or Elementary Treaty of Perspective for Artists (1820), treaty. Museum of Romanticism, Madrid.
- Defeat of the revolutionaries on their departure from the Island of León on July 16, 1823 (18??), engraved by P. Wagner. Spanish National Library
- Arrival of The Duke of Angouleme at the Port of Santa María on August 16th (18??), engraved by P. Wagner. Spanish National Library
- Absolutist reaction in 1823, copy of an original painting by José María Bonifaz. Spanish National Library
- Gallery (1830) Alcázar of Seville
- The Young Beggar (1844), copy of an original painting by Murillo. Spanish National Library
- The fruit seller (1844) Spanish National Library
- Magdalena (1844) copy of an original painting by Juan de Valdés Leal. Spanish National Library
- The Pity (1844), copy of an original painting by Caravaggio. Spanish National Library
- The Souls of Purgatory (1844), copy of an original painting by Murillo. Spanish National Library
- Psyche and Cupid (1844), copy of an original painting by Miguel Angel Amerigi. Spanish National Library
- Adornment of the museum square to celebrate the wedding of Isabella II (1846) museum square, Seville.
