= José Jiménez Aranda =

Spanish painter (1837–1903)

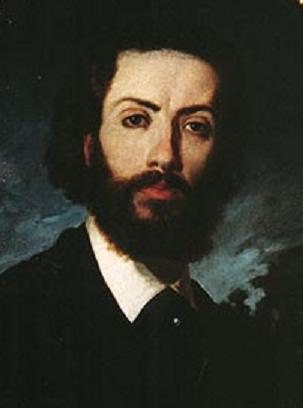
- Self-portrait of José Jiménez Aranda painted around 1870. Museo de Bellas Artes de Sevilla.
- Born: 7 February 1837; Seville, Spain
- Died: 6 May 1903 (aged 66); Seville, Spain
- Known for: Painting

José Jiménez Aranda (7 February 1837 – 6 May 1903) was a Spanish painter and brother of the painters Luis Jiménez Aranda and Manuel Jiménez Aranda.

== Biography and works ==
=== Origins and early influences ===
He was initiated in his first steps towards becoming a painter by Manuel Cabral and Eduardo Cano.

Gifted at drawing, in 1851 he entered the Real Academia de Bellas Artes de Santa Isabel de Hungría (Royal Academy of Fine Arts of Saint Elizabeth of Hungary) in Seville. In 1868 he studied the collections in the Museo del Prado (Prado Museum) in Madrid, especially those of Goya and Velázquez. In 1867 he travelled to Jerez de la Frontera to work as a restorer and designer of stained glass. In 1871 he moved to Rome, where he remained for four years, getting to know Mariano Fortuny, who greatly influenced his paintings.

=== Travel ===
In 1881 he moved to París, where he studied for nine years, painting works set in the eighteenth century in the style of Fortuny with notable success. In 1890 he moved to Madrid, painting scenes of everyday life in a more costumbrista style.

=== Return to his city of birth ===
The death of his wife and daughter in 1892 resulted in his returning to his city of birth for the rest of his life. There he was appointed member of the Academy of Fine Arts, where he became a teacher, a position he held until his death in 1903. Daniel Vázquez Díaz, Eugenio Hermoso, Ricardo López Cabrera, Manuel González Santos and Sanz Arizmendi were his pupils during this time in Seville.

In the last decade of the nineteenth century he frequented the Alcala de Guadaíra circle of landscape painters, leaving this genre some examples of "grand master" works (according to Sorolla).

Among his best known works are: A Pass in the Bullring (1880), Una desgracia (A Disaster – 1890) and Slave for Sale (c. 1897).

He was also a noted cartoonist and illustrator, producing 689 highlighted drawings for the tercentenary edition of Don Quijote (published 1905).

== Gallery ==
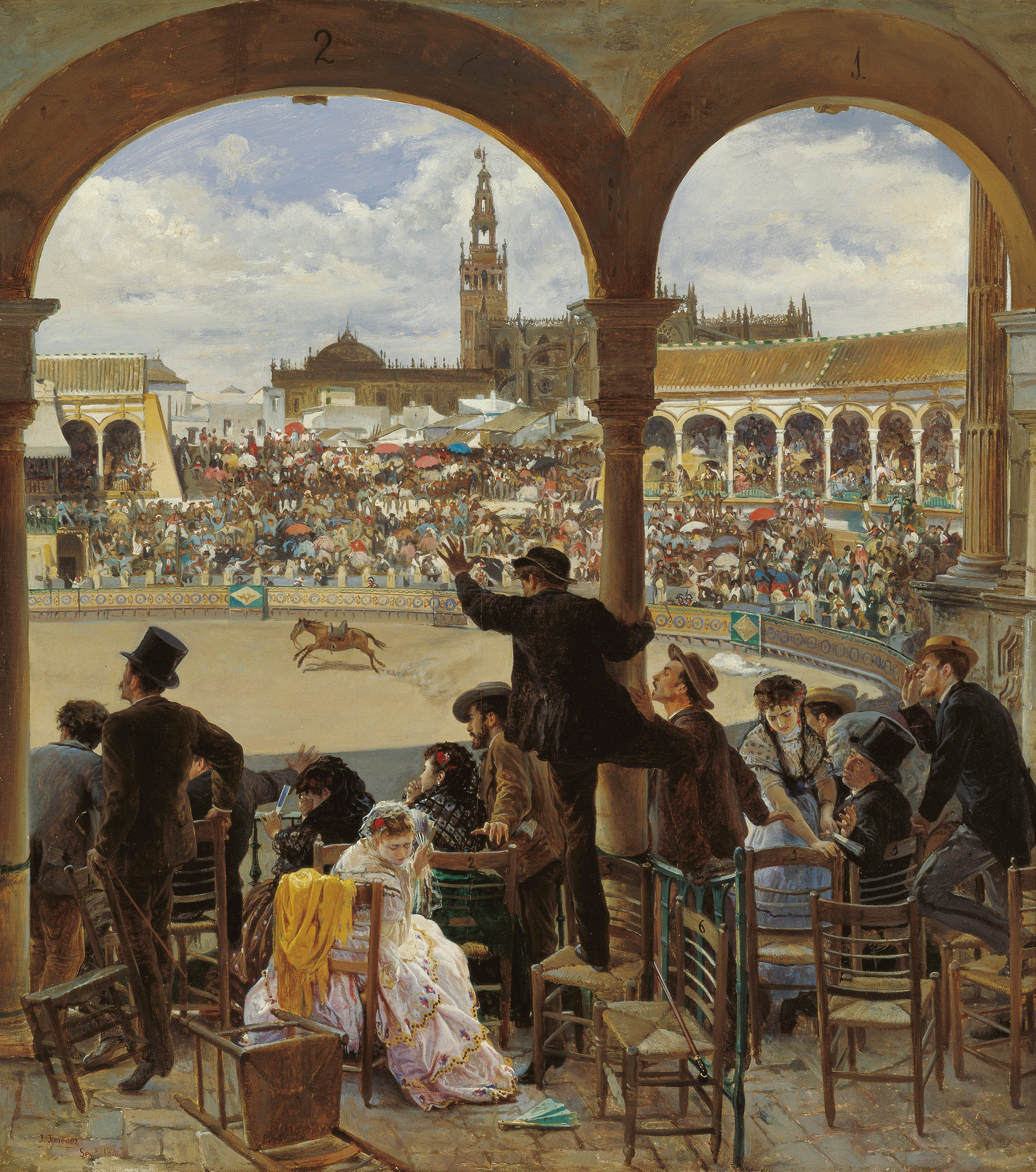
A Pass in the Bullring

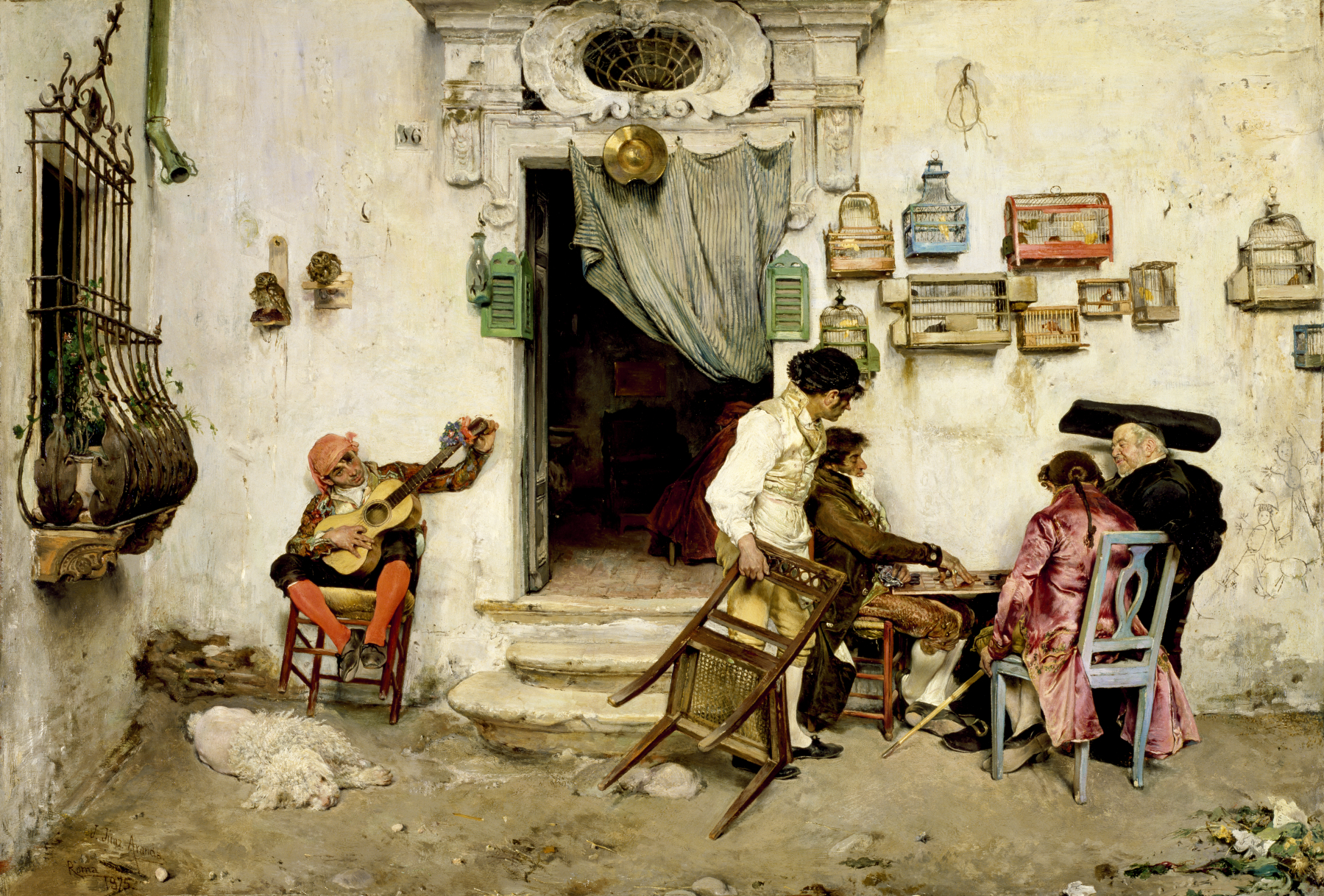
Figaro's Shop, 1875 Walters Art Museum

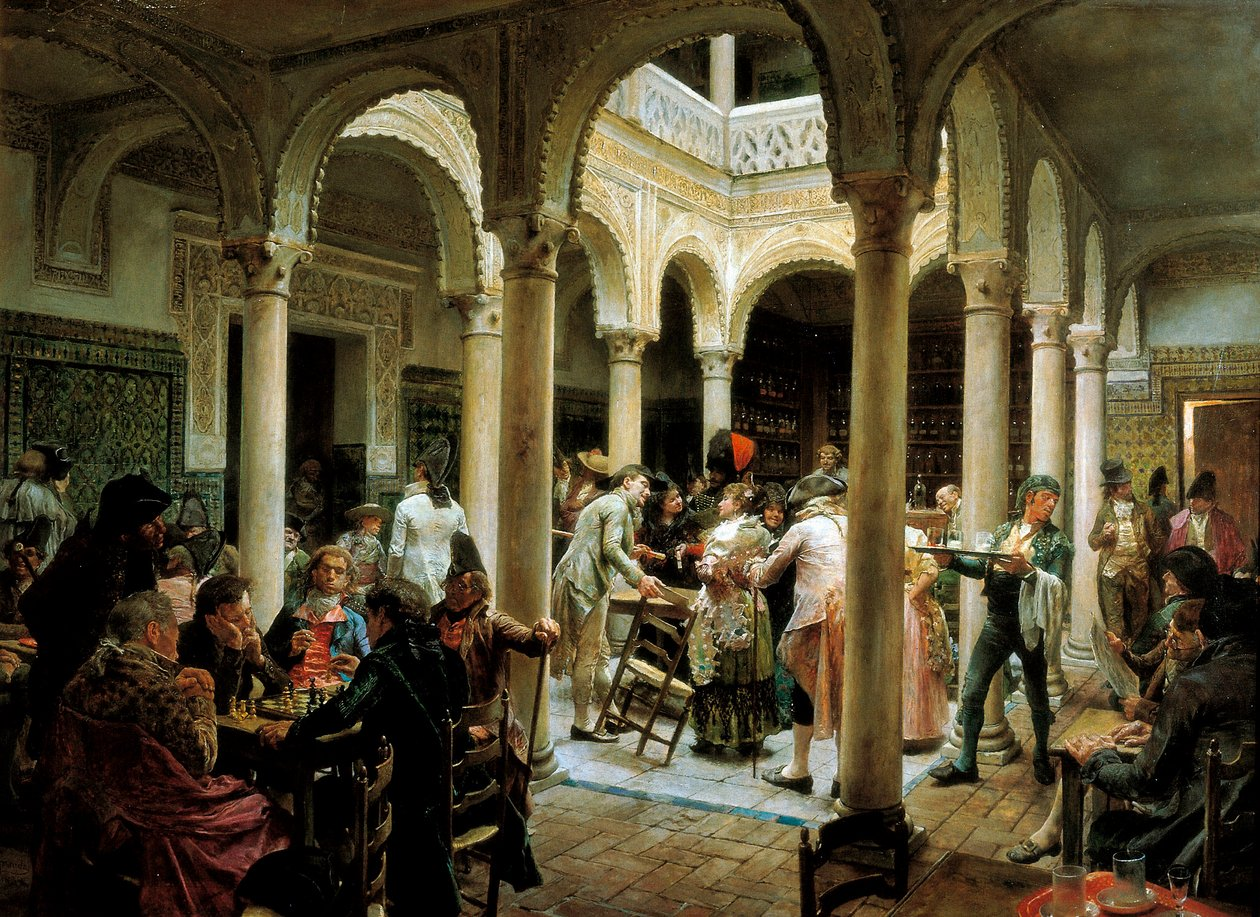
The coffee of José Jiménez Aranda

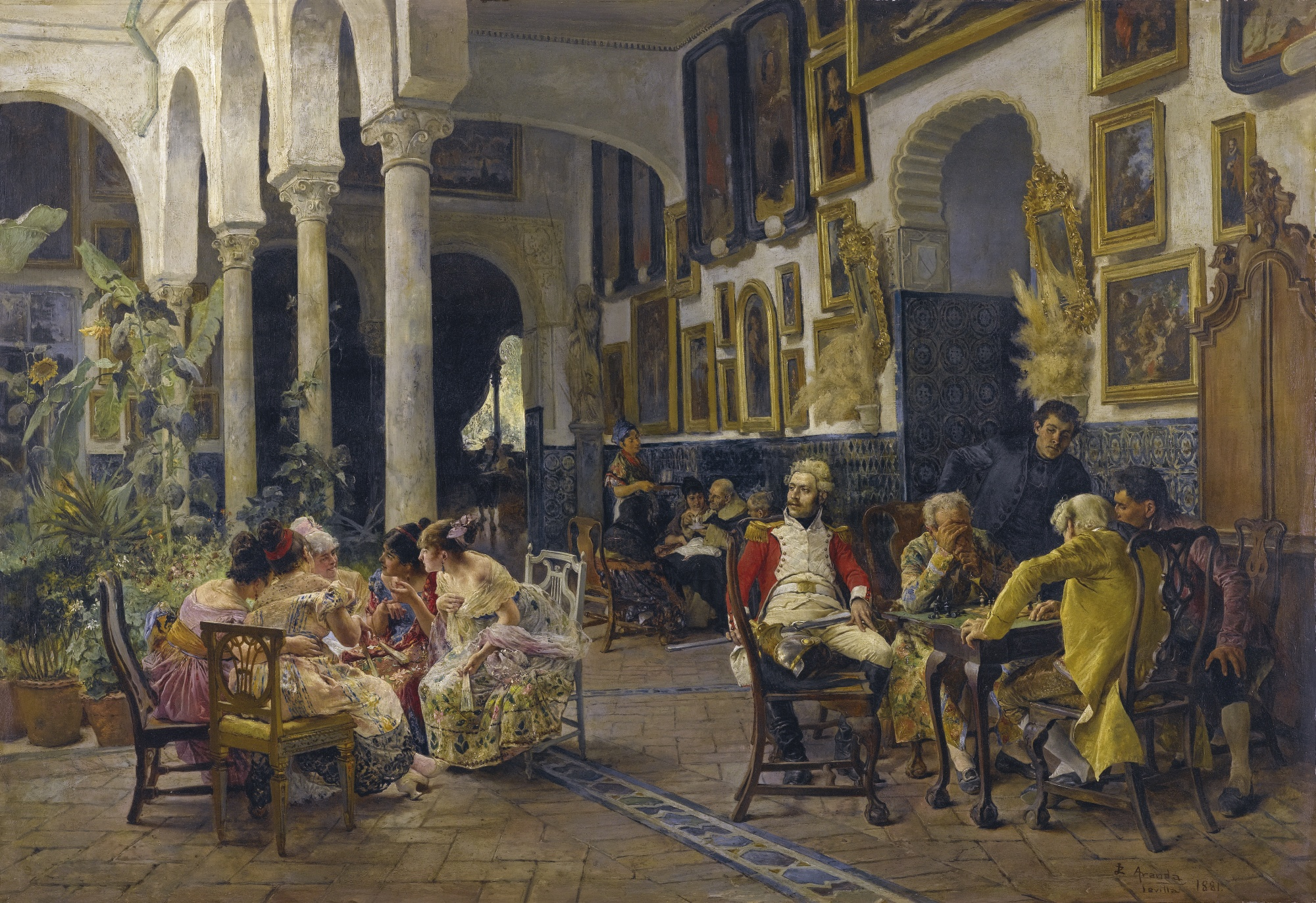
Conversation in a Sevillan Courtyard

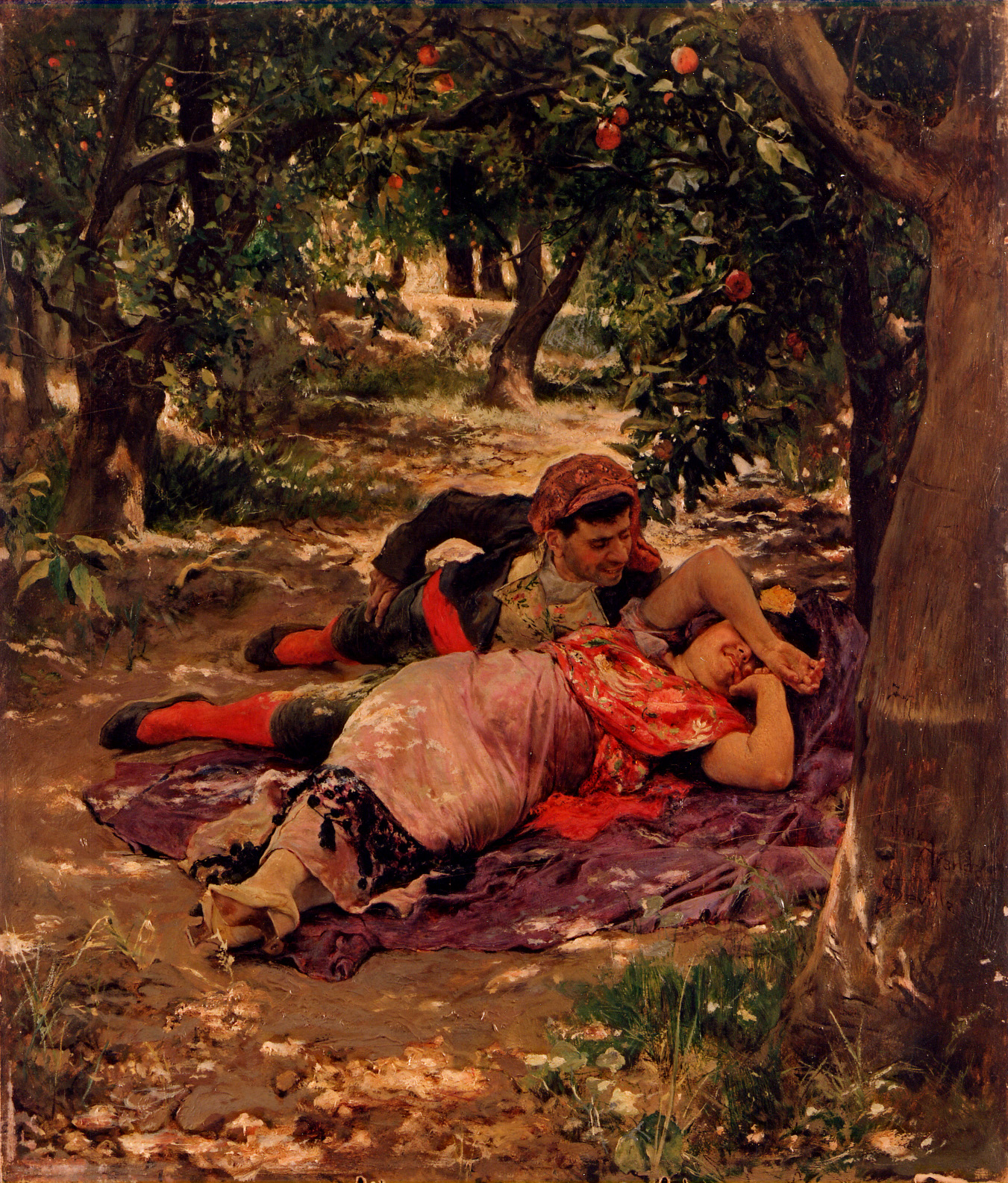
Under the oranges 1900

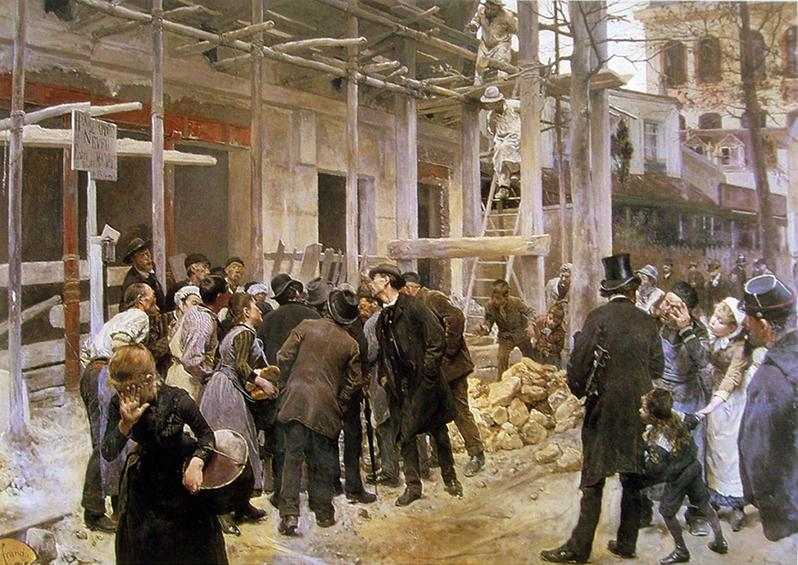
Una desgracia (A Disaster), 1890 Museo de Bellas Artes de Sevilla

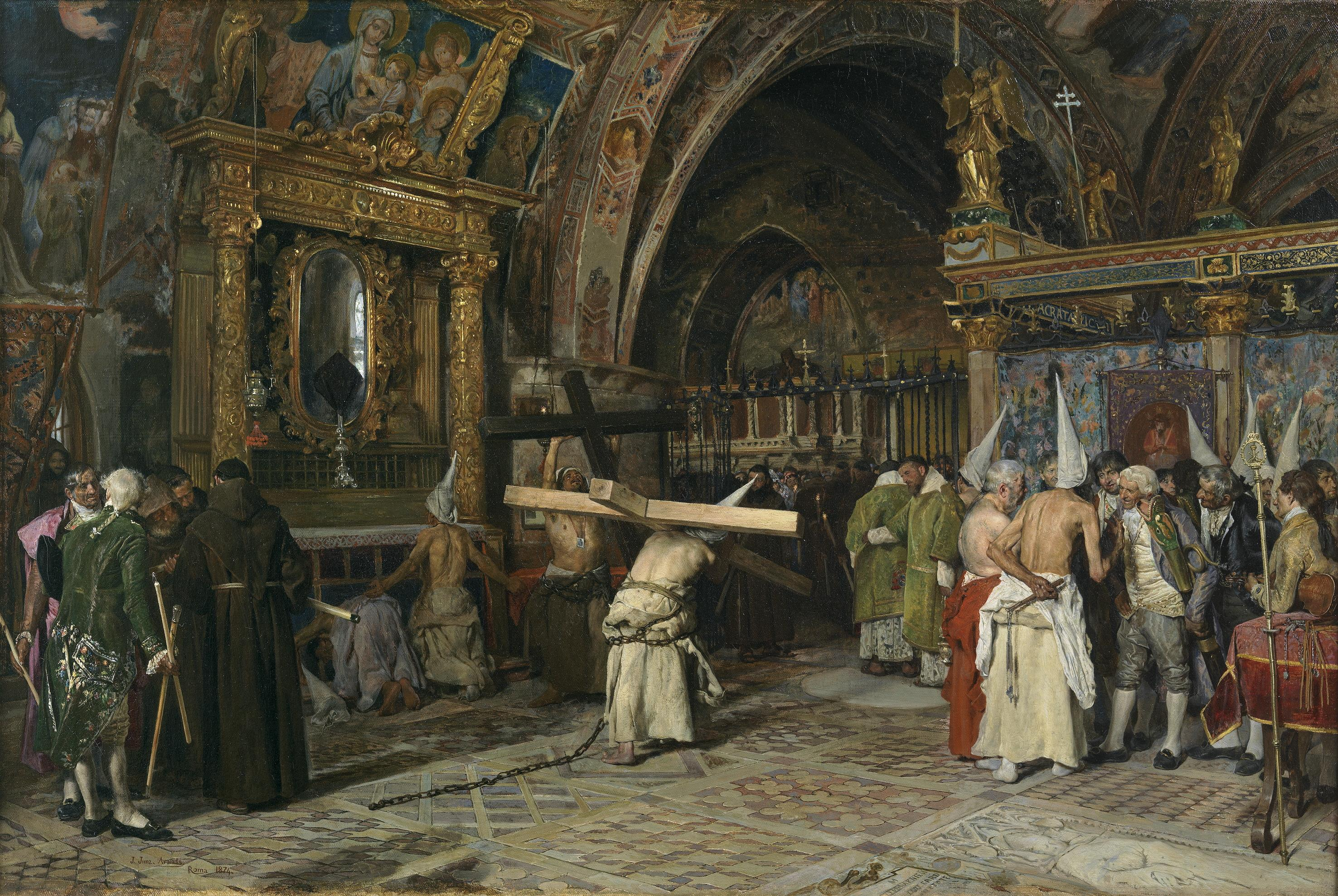
Penitents at the Basilica of Saint Francis of Assisi, Museo del Prado

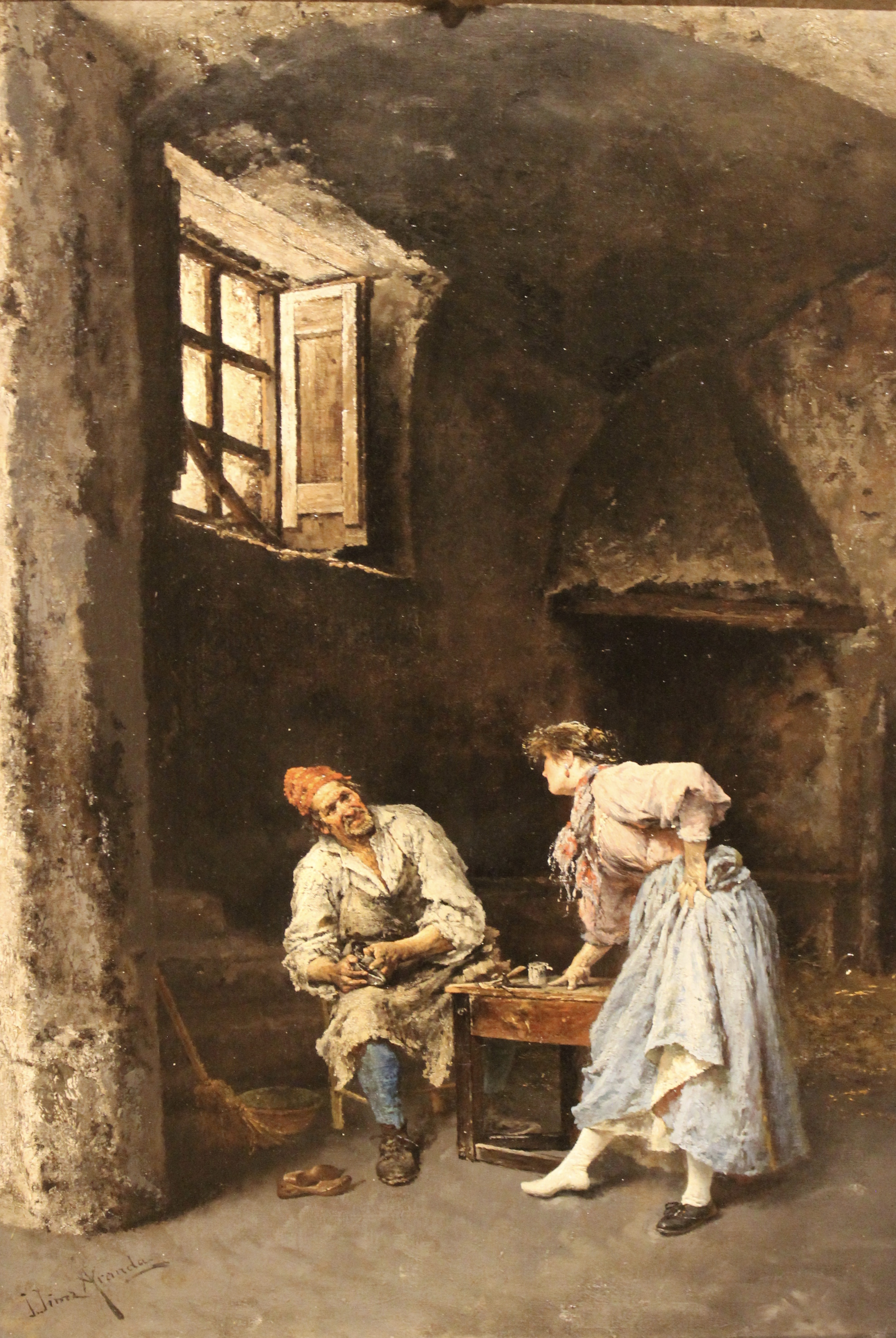
At the Cobblers, Widener University Art Museum

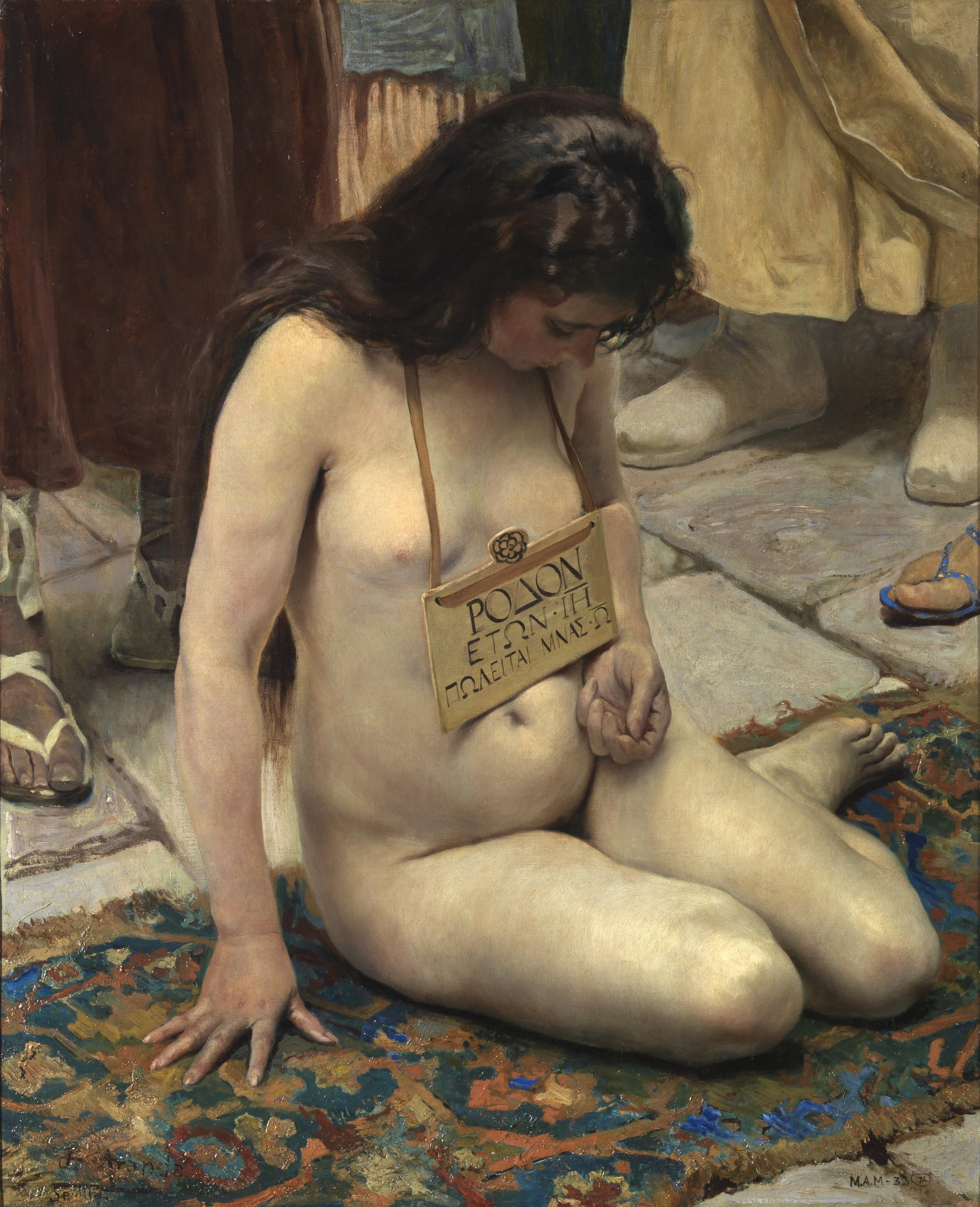
Slave for Sale

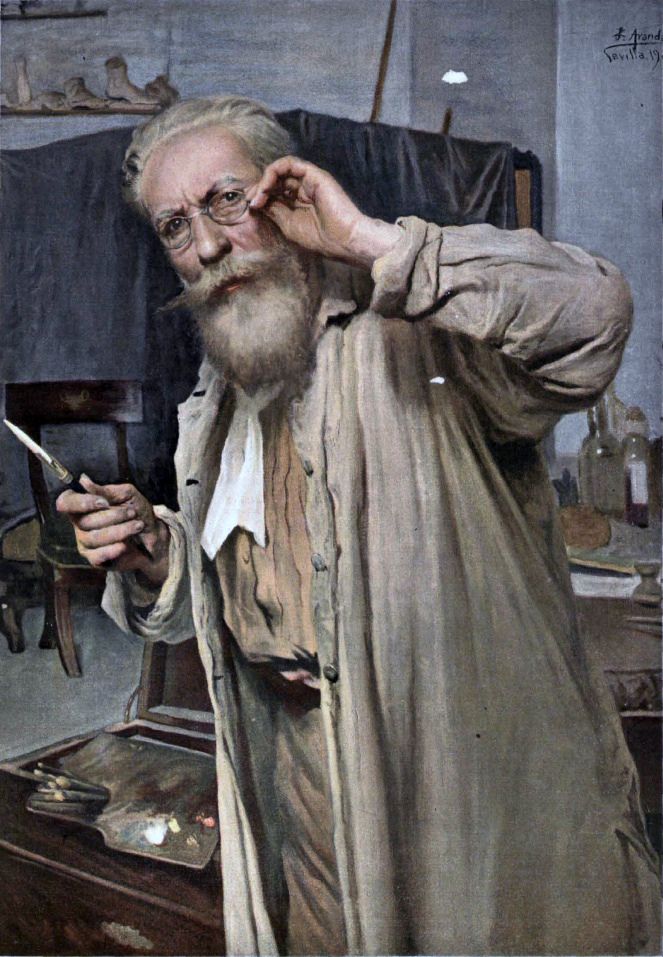
Self-portrait
