= Casa de los Pinelo =

Renaissance-era building in Seville, Spain

Coordinates: 37°23′15″N 5°59′28″W

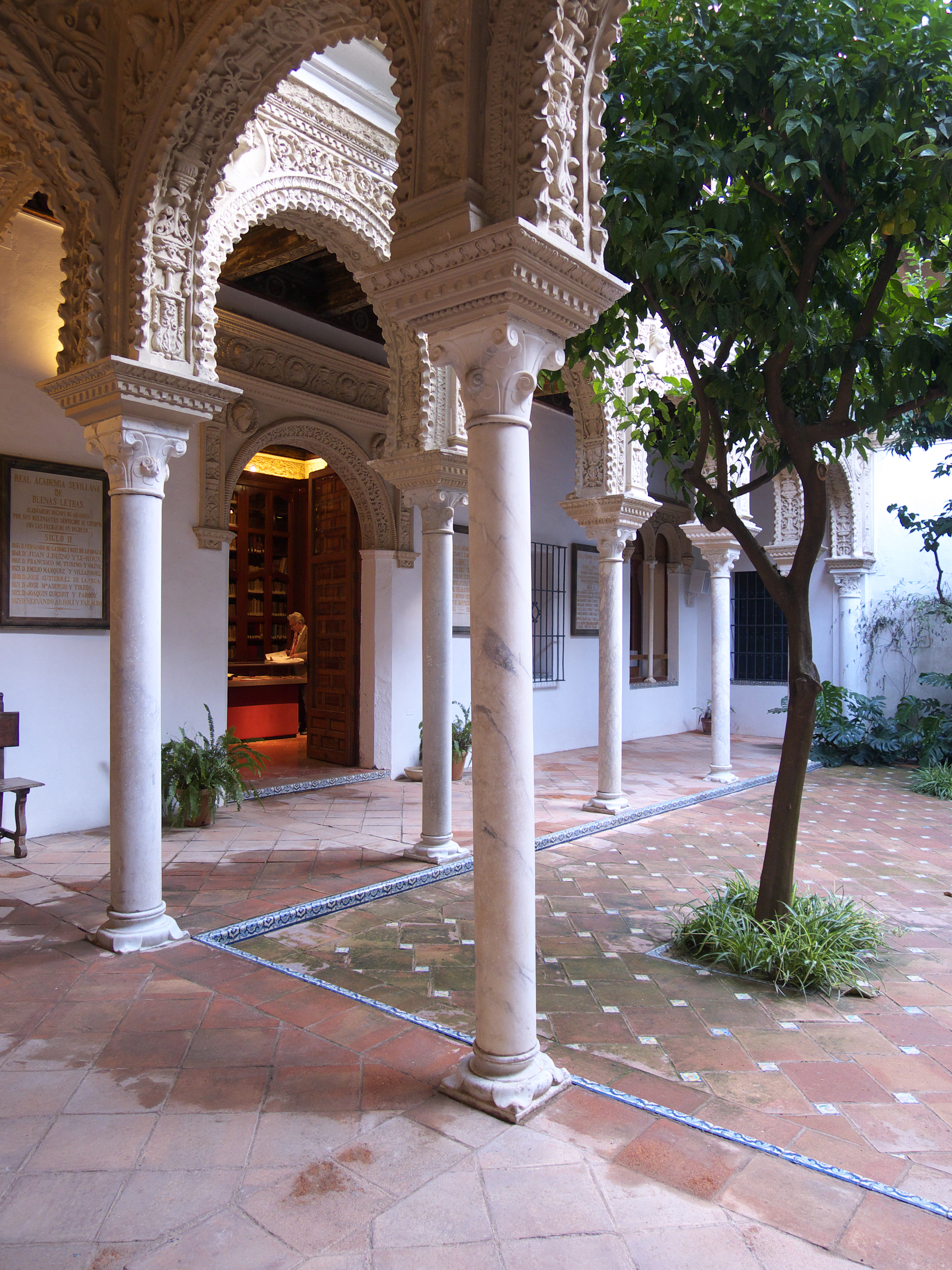
Courtyard of the house

The Casa de los Pinelo is a Renaissance-era building located in the centre of Seville in Spain. It houses both the Real Academia Sevillana de Buenas Letras and the Real Academia de Bellas Artes de Santa Isabel de Hungría. It is named after one of its former owners, Francisco Pinelo (d. 1509), a wealthy merchant.

The house dates from the 16th century and is centered around a courtyard, per the traditional layout that has been used in the region since the Roman period. The house mixes a number of architectural styles, such as the Plateresque motifs in the plasterwork of its arches, its Mudéjar ceilings, and a Gothic-style mirador (balcony) in the uppermost level.
