= Slave for Sale =

Painting by José Jiménez Aranda

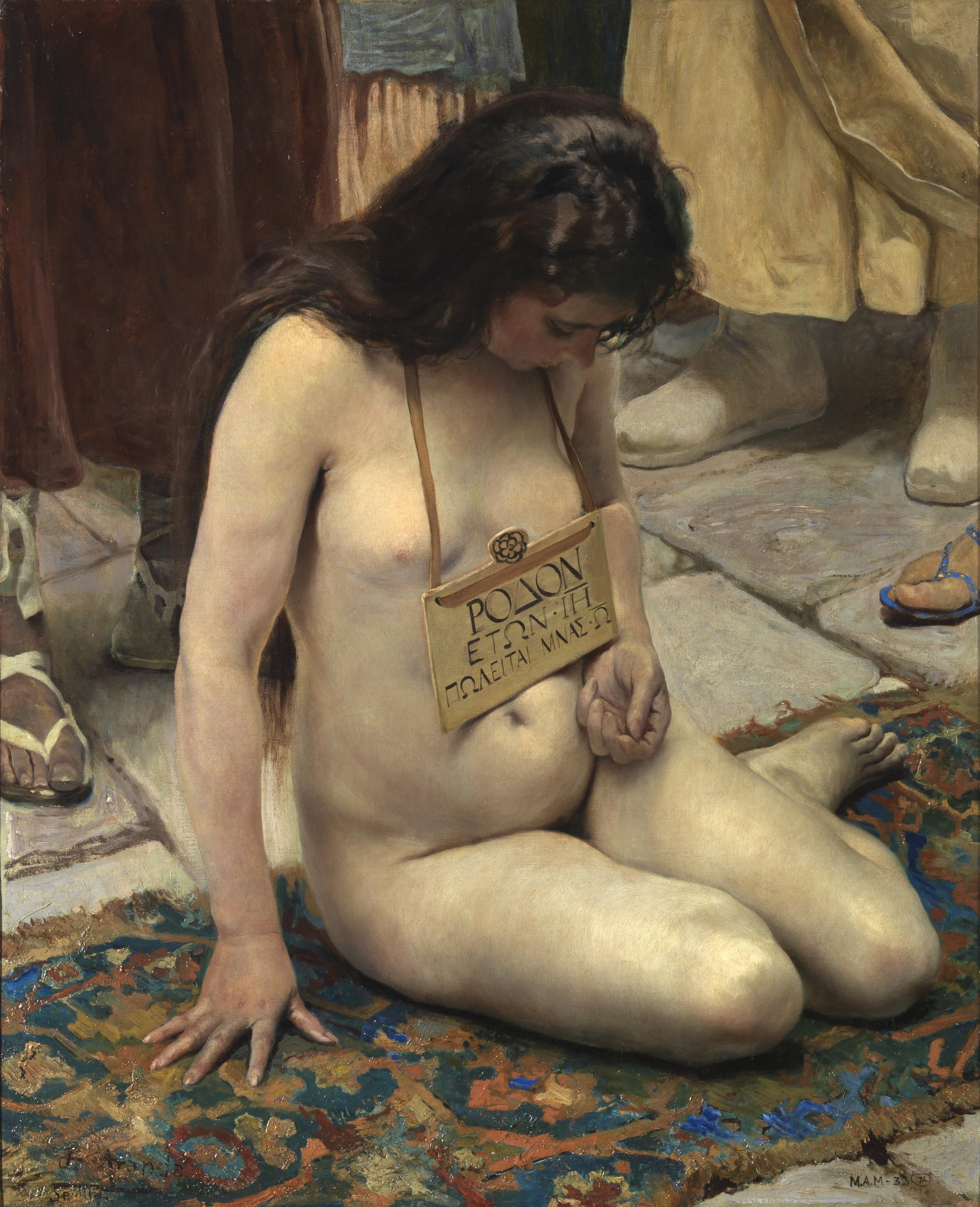

Una esclava en venta is a painting by José Jiménez Aranda. Aranda was a Spanish painter, from Sevilla. The painting was made in 1897. Today, it is in the Museo de Málaga. It measures 100 by 82cm. In English, it is called Slave for Sale.

In 1905, the Museo de Arte Moderno bought the painting. Today, the Museo de Arte Moderno is part of Museo del Prado. It was in that museum between 1905 and 1971. Between 1971 and 1995, it was shown in the Museo Español de Arte Contemporáneo. From 1995 to 2016 it was in the Museo Nacional Centro de Arte Reina Sofía. Today, it is in the Museo de Málaga.

== Description ==
The painting shows a young slave, who is completely naked. The slave is sitting on a carpet. The slave shows a sign in Greek. The sign offers her for sale. The scene shows part of an oriental market. In the background, the feet of possible buyers can be seen. They are standing around her to look at her helpless nudity.

This painting is one of the most emblematic paintings of José Jiménez Aranda. Aranda painted few pictures of nude women, and few with an orientalist theme.

Painters of his generation loved to paint in this style. The painting shows the taste for the exotic and oriental, yet it keeps with the ideals of Romanticism. It shows sensuality and high quality when studying the human anatomy. The framing is unusual. It shows an almost cinematographic setting, a prostrate young woman surrounded by the feet of her possible buyers. There also is a high contrast between the vividly-colored carpet and the pale skin of the slave, who is shown with great dignity.

There is a Greek text on the sign. It reads:

ΡΟΔΟΝ

ΕΤΩΝ ΙΗ

ΠΟΛΕΙΤΑΙ ΜΝΑΣ Ω

This can be translated as

Rose,

18 years old,

being sold for 800 coins
