= José María Romero López =

Spanish painter

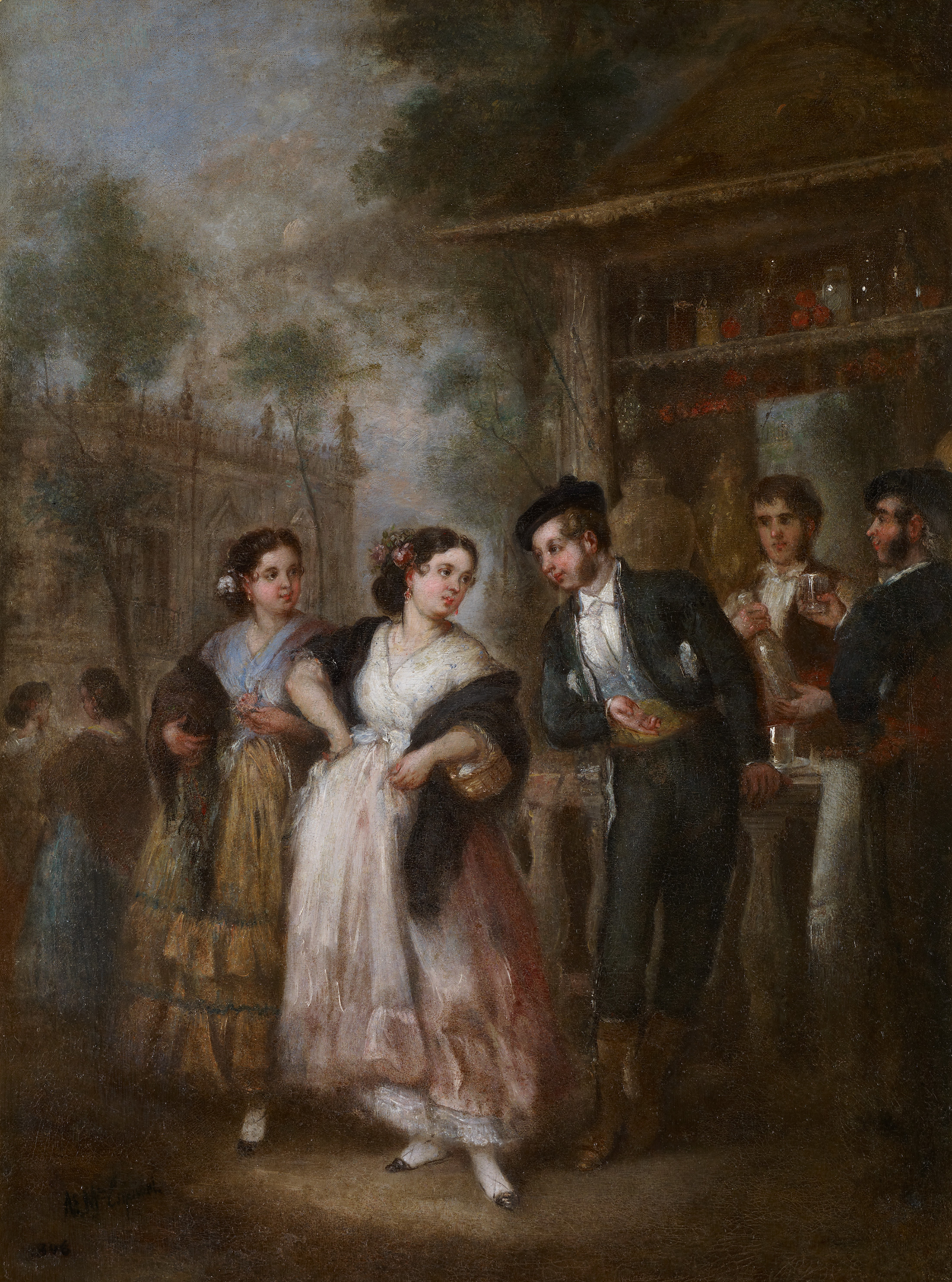
Refreshments

José María Romero López (12 May 1816 in Seville – October 1894 in Madrid) was a Spanish painter in the Romantic style. Some sources give his year of death as 1880 or 1888.

== Biography ==
Very few details of his early life are known for certain. In 1838, already a working artist, he was registered as a member of the Real Sociedad Económica Sevillana de Amigos del País; having gained his membership by donating a work called "The Coronation of the Drunkards", rather than paying the usual cash fee. They also presented him with a letter of appreciation for some cabinetmaking he had done.

In 1840, he became an assistant professor of drawing at the Escuela de Bellas Artes de Sevilla. Beginning in 1848, he taught classes in sketching. The following year, he was installed in the Palacio de San Telmo; doing work for Antoine, Duke of Montpensier. From 1860 to 1866, he was a member of the Real Academia de Bellas Artes de Santa Isabel de Hungría. From 1840 to 1879, he was a regular participant in the National Exhibition of Fine Arts.

In 1866, he moved to Cádiz, where he was also a member of the Real Academia Provincia del Bellas Artes de Cádiz until 1875, when he probably returned to Seville. In 1879, he established himself in Madrid, where he painted portraits and some religious works. By 1889, he was in Málaga, working as a Professor of color and composition at the Real Academia de Bellas Artes de San Telmo. He stayed until sometime in 1893, when his age and health forced him to retire. He was buried in Madrid in 1894, possibly having gone there looking for clients.

In addition to museums in Spain, his works may be seen in Cuba; at the Museo Nacional de Bellas Artes de La Habana.
