= Real Academia Sevillana de Buenas Letras =

Coordinates: 37.387666°N 5.991052°W

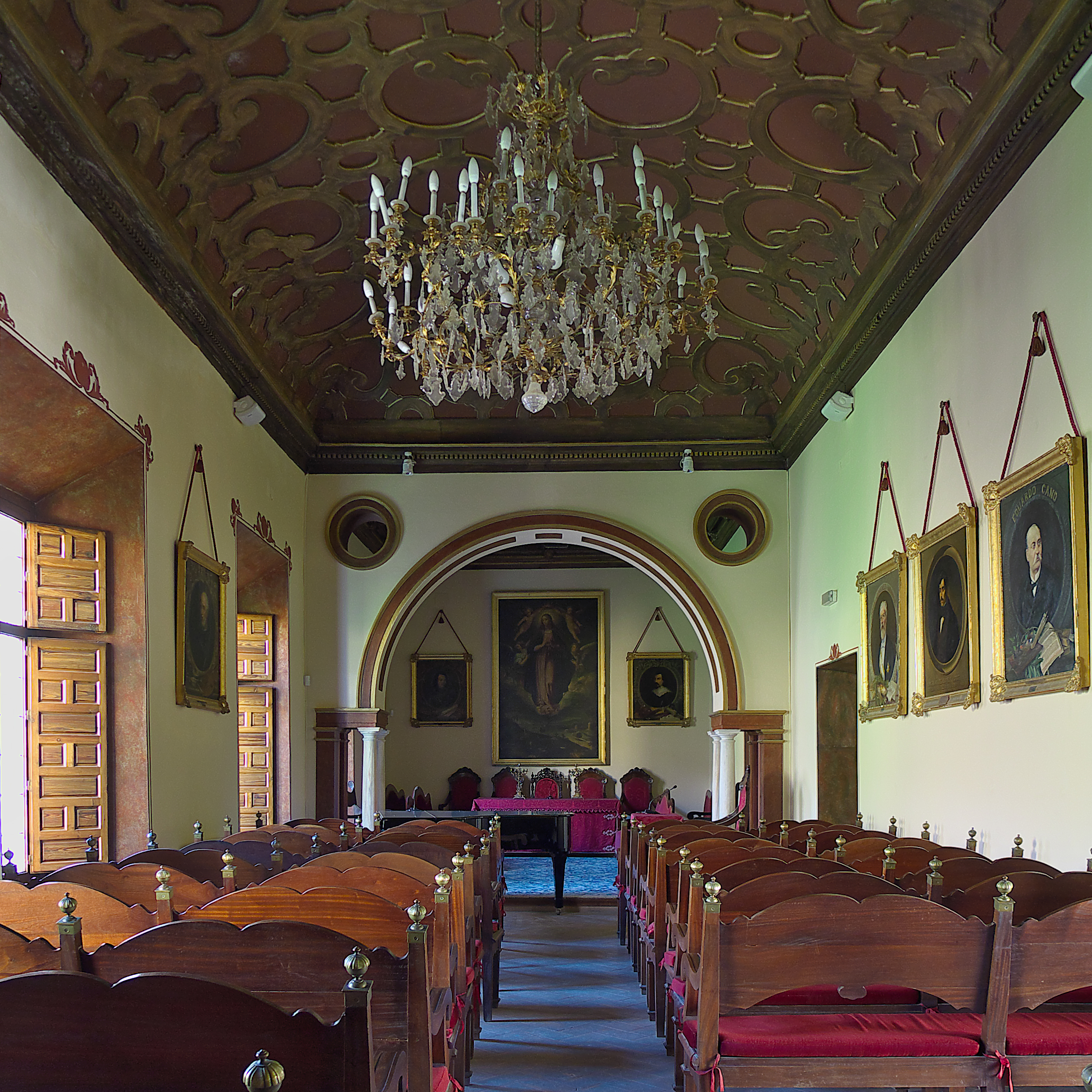
Assembly Hall, Real Academia Sevillana de Buenas Letras in April 2014.

The Real Academia Sevillana de Buenas Letras (Seville Royal Academy of Literature) is located in the Casa-Palacio de los Pinelo in central Seville, Spain. It is dedicated to the research and study of the cultural heritage of Seville and Andalusia. It was founded by Luis Germán and Ribon in 1591.
