= Pepi Sánchez =

Spanish painter (1929–2012)

Pepi Sánchez was a Sevillian painter. Born in 1929, she moved to Madrid in 1958 and lived there until she died in 2012.

Her style featured oneiric elements and had a Baroque influence. Her work represents an addition to Spanish plastic arts. She was known for her use of unmodified rocks and stones as a support for her paintings. The characters that inhabit the structures in her paintings adapt themselves to the grooves in the stones, resulting in a combination of painting and sculpture.

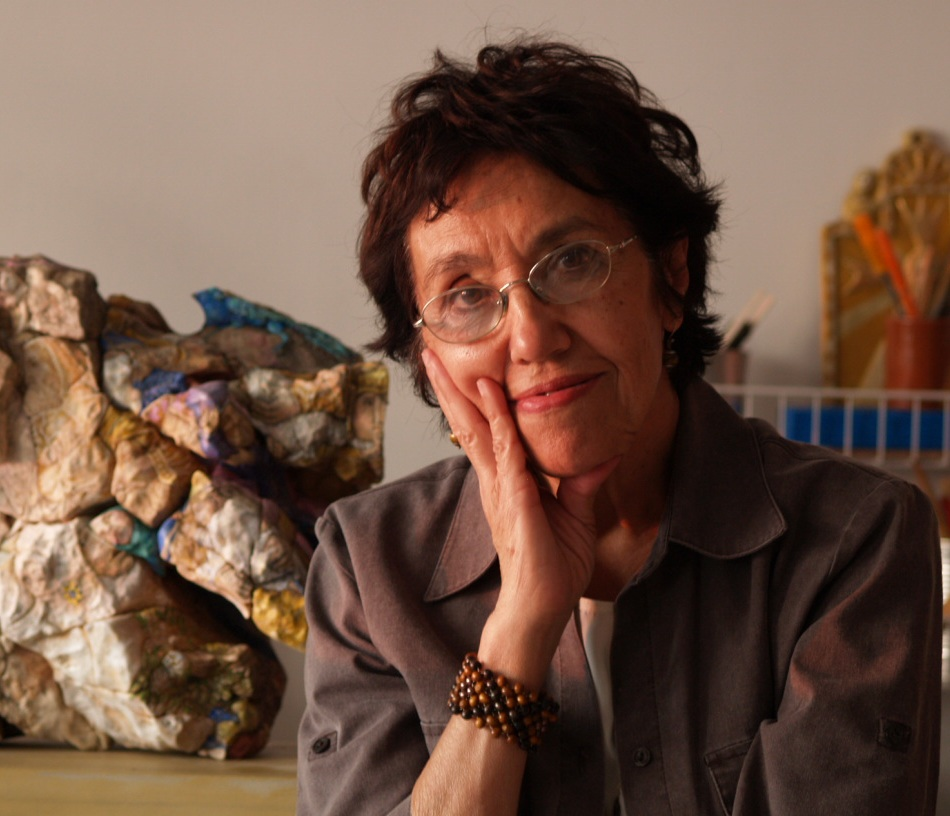
Pepi Sánchez

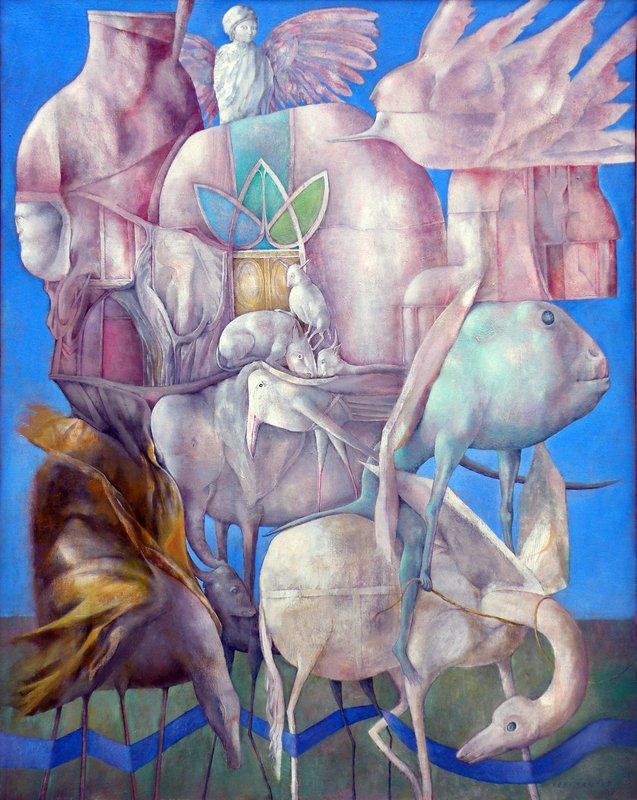
Óleo sobre lienzo 92x731991

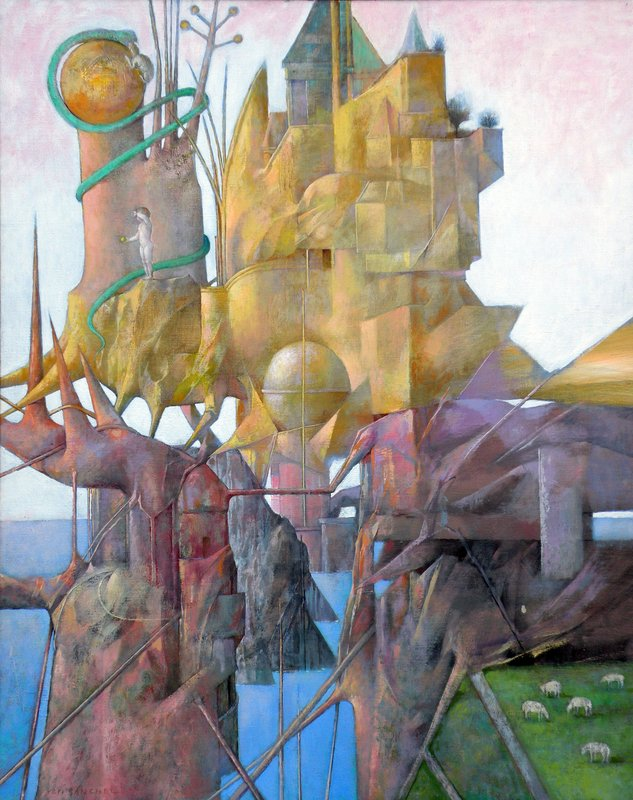
Óleo sobre lienzo 100x811994

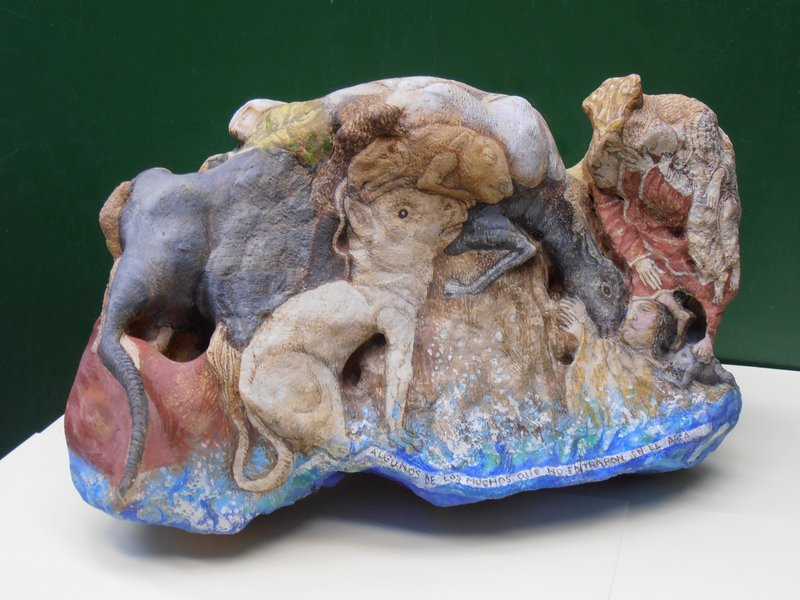
Algunos de los muchos que no entraron en el arca A - 29x19x17 - 2010

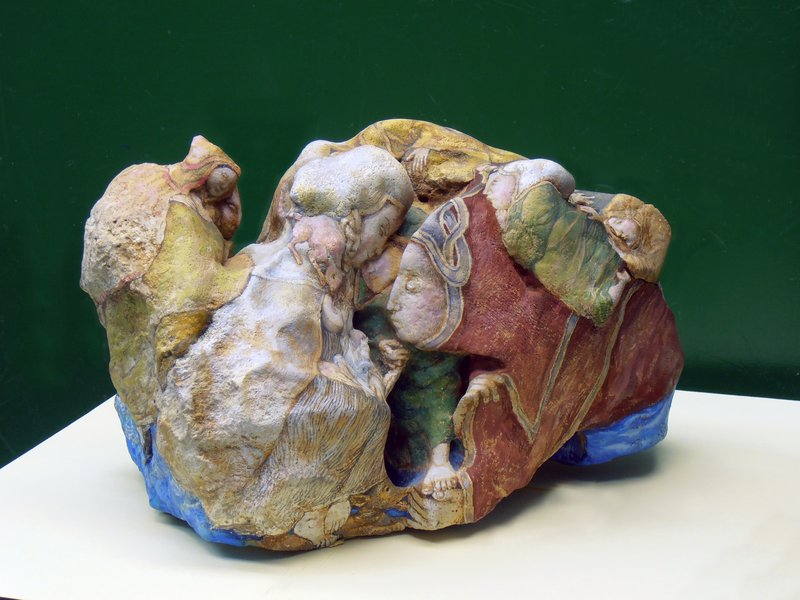
Algunos de los muchos que no entraron en el arca B - 29x19x17 - 2010

== Early life ==
Josefa Sánchez Díaz started at the age of 12 when she joined the Santa Isabel de Hungria School of Fine Arts, in Seville. There her talent impressed teachers, as proven by her high grades and the awards she received. Later, however, these same teachers were to feel disappointed when, after finishing her training, she left the mainstream Realism, which she mastered, to start a new path, breaking away from the established styles.

Challenged by the dominant traditionalism, "She began working at what was starting to be called 'Modern Art', and refused to submit to the interfering past", declared José María Moreno Galván at the presentation of her first individual exhibition in Madrid (1954). After this first exhibition, there have been more than fifty opportunities to admire her work.

Recurring subjects in her work include angels, children, fantastical animals, princesses, and mythical creatures, often set in dreamlike, imaginary landscapes and structures. Alongside these, her paintings also depict figures such as feminists, disillusioned princes, weary caryatids, and dying stars; according to the museum, these figures convey messages that remain critical and forceful despite the gentleness of her style.

== Biography ==
Josefa Sánchez Díaz, was born in Seville on 4 April 1929, second daughter of Ana María Díaz and José Sánchez. She had an elder sister, Lola.

Her father died from peritonitis when Pepi was only two years old. As a result, the young widow moved with her daughters to the house of her sister Concha, who was twenty years her elder and married to an Italian, Ernesto de Micheli Rivaro, employed at the Italian Consulate.

This childless couple "adopted" these two girls, involving themselves completely in their education. Uncle Micheli took the role of the father figure, while the two sisters, the cheerful Ana Maria and the more serious and formal Concha, shared the role of mother.

With a strict old fashioned view on education, this Italian from the outskirts of Milan was contrary to the idea of the girls going to school, preferring to provide them with private education. Consequently, he hired a teacher to come home every day. This childhood with little contact with other children led Pepi not to savour her infancy and left her wishing to prolong it.

Uncle Micheli was a strong influence in the artistic development of the two sisters. He was an expert and a great admirer of Italian art, and he helped them appreciate and love it from an early age. As a result, both sisters decided they wanted to become painters. At the young age of 9 and 12, Pepi and Loli entered Jose Maria Labrador's studio, a Cordovan painter settled in Seville, A few years later the two sisters joined the Santa Isabel de Hungria School of Fine Arts in Seville. Pepi was only 12, so she needed a special permit from the Ministry of Education to join the school. Soon she started standing out and earned State Awards in all her courses.

Her two trips to Italy in 1952 and 1955 were important in developing Pepi's style. Directly seeing Giotto, Mantegna, Paolo Ucello, Piero Della Francesca frescoes and all the Italian art that she had admired for years through books and photographs, left an indelible imprint.

Open to everything that meant renovation and modernity, after finishing her training, she broke with the official academic-ism and joined an avant-garde group called "Young Sevillian School of Painting and Sculpture".

As we can see from her Curriculum Vitae, Pepi's paintings, ceramics and mosaics were to be admired in many exhibitions.

In 1958 she married the Sevillian writer, Manuel Garcia Viño, and in a search for a more modern environment, they moved to Madrid. They stayed some time with Rafael Montesinos, a Sevillian poet, and his wife Marisa, until they received the keys to their new home.

The children followed soon: Monica (1959), Patricia (1960), Manolo (1962), Pablo (1964) and Chema (1966).

Being the mother of a large family with all the responsibilities and work entailed, did not stop her from devoting herself to her art with courageous perseverance.

There was a clear change in her iconography after she became a mother. As from 1959 her world became more personal That was the time when her world became the fantasy of princes, wizards and legendary characters, taking on those poetic and suggestive titles. It was also during those first years of motherhood that she started a busy career as an illustrator. She would become a frequent collaborator for "La Estafeta Literaria", among others, and in 1966 she illustrated "Historia y Antología de la Literatura Infantil Iberoamericana" by Carmen Bravo Villasante, Doncel publishing house.

In 1965, while playing with the children, she discovered stones as a support for her magical characters. At first, she used rounded stones from the river beds. Later, as her compositions became more baroque, she made use of lime stones with complex forms and grooves, found in the province of Guadalajara.

Her singular imaginative world has been a source of inspiration to her husband and many other poets and writers, who have written about her and her art: Manuel Alcántara, Montserrat del Amo, Marcelo Arroita-Jáuregui, Alfonso Canales, Antonio Enrique, Francisco Garfias, Antonio Hernández, Luis Jiménez Martos, Antonio Leyva, Manuel Mantero, Joaquín Márquez, Rafael Montesinos, Rafael Morales, Federico Muelas, Digna Palou, Fernando Quiñones, José María Requena, Mariano Roldán and Lázaro Santana are among them.

In 1984 she and the politician and art collector, Agustin Rodriguez Sahagun, signed an exclusivity contract, which his heirs took through to 2002.

An indefatigable worker, she continued painting until a few days before she died on 5 March 2012 in Madrid.

== Museums and Public Collections ==
- Museo Nacional Centro de Arte Reina Sofía.
- Museo de Arte Contemporáneo de Toledo.
- Museo de Arte Contemporáneo de Sevilla.
- Museo de Arte Contemporáneo de Vilafamés. Castellón.
- Museo Etnográfico de Povoa de Varzim, Oporto, Portugal.
- Museo Nacional de Artes Decorativas. Madrid.
- Museo Internacional de Arte Contemporáneo de Guinea Ecuatorial.
- Escuela de Estudios Hispanoamericanos de Sevilla.
- Instituto Nacional de Educación Física, Madrid.
- Ateneo de Madrid.
- Ministerio de Educación y Ciencia, Madrid.
- Caja de Ahorros de Córdoba.
- Escuela Superior de Santa Isabel de Hungría de Sevilla.
- Caja de Ahorros de San Fernando de Sevilla.
- Centro Cultural Español de El Cairo.
- Museo Provincial de Badajoz.
- Museo Municipal de Huete, Cuenca.

== Bibliography ==
- Alcántara, Manuel: "De cómo Pepi Sánchez hace hablar a las piedras". Madrid: Arriba, 19-5-1979.
- Alfaro, J.R.: "Pepi Sánchez o la apoteosis de todos los sueños y fábulas". Madrid: Informaciones. La hoja del lunes, 26-11-1963.

- "Pepi Sánchez". Madrid: La hoja del lunes, 17-2-1969.

- Amores, Francisco: "Entrevistas en cuatro capítulos: Pepi Sánchez y Manuel García Viñó". Sevilla: ABC, 3, 5, 6 y 7-12-1972.
- Andujar, Manuel: "Piedras iluminadas". Xalapa, México: Estela Cultural, 9-9-1979.
- Anglada, Francisco: "Pepi Sánchez, la sugerente pintura nítida". Sevilla: Nueva Andalucía, 25-5-1978.
- Antolín, Mario: "Pepi Sánchez", Madrid: El Imparcial, 5-6-1979.

- "Pepi Sánchez", Madrid: El Imparcial, 18-3-1980.
- "Pepi Sánchez", Madrid: Ya, 12-1-1985.

- Aragonés, Juan Emilio: "De la última promoción a la nueva ola. Una pintora: Pepi Sánchez". Madrid: La Estafeta Literaria, 15-6-1960.
- Arbós Balleste, Santiago: "Pepi Sánchez", Madrid: ABC, 28-11-1963.
- Areán, Carlos: "Joven Figuración en España". Madrid: Publicaciones Españolas, 1963.

- "Pepi Sánchez", Madrid: Cuadernos de Arte, Publicaciones Españolas, 1964. n.º 104.
- "La pintura de Pepi Sánchez", Madrid: La Estafeta Literaria, 1969, n.º 417.
- "Tres muestras en el Ateneo". Pamplona: Nuestro tiempo, 1969, n.º 178.
- "Arte joven en España", Madrid: Publicaciones Españolas, 1971.
- Treinta años de Arte Español, Madrid: Editorial Guadarrama, 1972.

- Aristeguieta, Jean: "Encuentro con una pintura admirable". Caracas, Venezuela: El Universal, 27-11-1954.
- Arnaldo, Paola: "Piedras con vida y arte". Madrid: Ama, 1-1982, n.º 531.
- Arroita Jáuregui, Marcelo: "Elogio de Pepi Sánchez". Madrid: El Alcázar, 18-12-1972.

- "La pintora sevillana Pepi Sánchez". Sevilla: ABC, 24-5-1974.
- "Desde Madrid, carta de presentación y de recomendación". Santander: Alerta, 30-5-1974.

- Arroyo, Julia: "Una pintora con duende: Pepi Sánchez". Madrid: Genial, 5-1967. n.º 4.

- "En el arte no influye ser hombre o mujer". Madrid: Ya, 25-1-1968.

- Azancot, Leopoldo: "Pepi Sánchez o la lógica del sueño". Madrid: La Estafeta Literaria, 1-1-1973. n.º 507.
- Azcoaga, Enrique: "Andaluces en Madrid". Madrid: Blanco y Negro, 1979.
- Bedia Casanueva, Diego: "Las piedras pintadas de Pepi Sánchez". Madrid: Bellas Artes 70, 1-1970. n.º 6.
- Bestard Fornís, Antonio: "Pepi Sánchez". Madrid: Arteguía, 1979. n.º 48-49.
- Botello, Fausto: "Dos valores de la joven escuela sevillana de pintura", Madrid: La Estafeta Literaria, 6-1957.

- "Pepi Sánchez otra vez en Sevilla". Sevilla: Sevilla, 5-1975.

- Bravo Villasante, Carmen: "La ilustración de libros infantiles". Madrid: Bellas Artes 70, 1970. n.º 2.
- Burgos, Antonio: "Pepi Sánchez habla sobre su exposición". Sevilla: ABC, 5-3-1969.
- Cabello Castejón, Rafael: "La sevillana Pepi Sánchez y sus valores pictóricos". Madrid: ABC, 8-11-1975.
- Cabezas, Juan Antonio: "Brujas, niños y ángeles de la sevillana Pepi Sánchez". Tánger: España, 22-9-1963.
- Cajide, Isabel: "El juego simbólico en la pintura de Pepi Sánchez", Madrid: Artes, 1962. n.º 22.
- Camón-Aznar, José: "María Josefa Sánchez". Madrid: ABC, 26-11-1954.

-"El arte en Madrid". Madrid: Revista Goya, noviembre-diciembre 1954. n.º 3.

- Campo Alange, Condesa de: "La poética ingenuidad de Pepi Sánchez". Madrid: Cuadernos de Arte, Editora Nacional, 1958, n.º 32
- Campoy, Antonio M.: "Navidad, Primavera del Arte", Madrid: Arriba, 18-12-1963.

- "Pepi Sánchez". Madrid: ABC, 1-12-1965.
- "Pepi Sánchez". Madrid: ABC, 14-2-1969.
- "Pepi Sánchez". Madrid: ABC, 19-12-1969
- "Pepi Sánchez" en Diccionario crítico del Arte Español Contemporáneo. Madrid: Ibérico Europea de Ediciones, 1973.
- "Pepi Sánchez". Madrid: ABC, 23-12-1972.
- "Pepi Sánchez". Madrid: ABC, 27-4-1974.
- "Las piedras de Pepi Sánchez". Madrid: ABC, 24-6-1979.
- "Pepi Sánchez". Madrid: ABC, 6-3-1980.

- Canales, Alfonso: "A Pepi Sánchez". Málaga: Librería Anticuaria El Guadalhorce, 1980.
- Carrasco, M: "Pepi Sánchez, la pintora sevillana de los cantos rodados". Sevilla: El Correo de Andalucía, 28-11-1981.
- Casanelles, María Teresa: "Pepi Sánchez". Madrid: Europeo, 14-6-1979.
- Castaño, Adolfo: "Pepi Sánchez". Madrid: La Estafeta Literaria, 1963. n.º 280.
- Castellano, José: "Figuras de Belén de Pepi Sánchez". Madrid: La Ballena Alegre, 1967. n.º 16.
- Castro Arines, José: "María Josefa Sánchez. Galería Estilo". Madrid: Informaciones, 1954.

- "Joven escuela sevillana". Madrid: Informaciones, 1955.
- "Pepi Sánchez". Madrid: Informaciones, 12-6-1962.
- "Pepi Sánchez". Barcelona: Diario de Barcelona, 30-11-1963.
- "Las piedras pintadas de Pepi Sánchez". Barcelona: Diario de Barcelona, 4-11-1965.
- "Los sueños de Pepi Sánchez". Madrid: Informaciones, 20-2-1969.
- "Pepi Sánchez". Madrid: Informaciones, 21-12-1972.
- "Pepi Sánchez". Madrid: Informaciones, 31-5-1979.

- Caveda, Jorge: "El realismo mágico de Pepi Sánchez". Madrid: La Voz Social, 1979. n.º 153.
- Chavarri, Raúl. La Pintura Española Actual. Madrid: Ibérico Europea de Ediciones, 1973.

-"La ingenuidad mágica de Pepi Sánchez". Madrid: Mundo Cooperativo, 1973. n.º 562.
- "El mundo mágico de Pepi Sánchez". Madrid: Cuadernos Hispanoamericanos, 1973. n.º 273.
- "Pepi Sánchez". Madrid: TG Revista de Artes Decorativas, 1973. n.º 4.
- "Nuevos Maestros de la Pintura Española". Madrid: Instituto de Cultura Hispánica. 1974.
- Artistas Contemporáneas en España. Madrid: Ediciones Galería Gavar, 1976.

- Conde, Manuel: "Pepi Sánchez". Madrid: Gaceta del Arte, 1974. n.º 23.
- Corredor Matheos, José: "Pepi Sánchez en el Ateneo barcelonés". Barcelona: Destino, 6-6-1964. n.º 1400.

- Pepi Sánchez. [Cat. exp. Barcelona]. Barcelona: Galería Laietana, 1978.
- El mundo pictórico de Pepi Sánchez. [Cat. exp. Sevilla]. Sevilla: Caja de Ahorros Provincial San Fernando de Sevilla, 1985.

- Cortés, Juan: "El soñado mundo de Pepi Sánchez". Barcelona: La Vanguardia de Barcelona, 14-6-1964.
- Danvila, José Ramón: "Pepi Sánchez". Sevilla: ABC, 8-6-1978.
- Díez Crespo, Manuel: "Pepi Sánchez en Galería Foro". Sevilla: Sevilla, 1-1973.

- "Pepi Sánchez expone en Madrid". Sevilla: Sevilla, 5-1974.

- Faraldo, Ramón: "María Josefa Sánchez". Madrid: Estilo, Arte-Hogar, 1-1954.

- "Pepi Sánchez". Madrid: Ya, 10-4-1958.
- "Apogeo del arte figurativo". Madrid: Ya, 12-12-1963.

- "Pepi Sánchez". Madrid: Ya, 27-11-1965.

- Félix: "Piedras trascendidas". Valladolid: Diario Regional, 24-12-1965.
- Fernández Braso, Miguel: "El paraíso de Pepi Sánchez". Madrid: ABC, 20-1-1973.
- Fernández Molina, Antonio: "Pepi Sánchez: Gift of inventing new worlds". Madrid: Iberian Daily Sun, 19-4-1972.

- "La realidad mágica de Pepi Sánchez". Madrid: La Estafeta Literaria, 1972. n.º 501.

- Figuerola Ferreti, Luís: "Pinturas de María Josefa Sánchez". Madrid: Arriba, 5-12-1954.

- "Pinturas de Pepi Sánchez". Madrid: Arriba, 23-4-1958.
- "La pintura de Pepi Sánchez". Madrid: Arriba, 29-6-1962.
- "Pepi Sánchez y su pintura". Madrid: Arriba, 1-12-1963.
- "Arte navideño de Pepi Sánchez". Madrid: Arriba, 28-11-1965.
- "Pepi Sánchez". Madrid: Goya,1979. n.º 153.
- "Pepi Sánchez". Madrid: Goya, 1980. n.º 159.

- Flórez, Elena: "Mundos encontrados en la pintura de Pepi Sánchez". Madrid: El Alcázar, 26-12-1972.

- "Magia singular en la pintura de Pepi Sánchez". Madrid: El Alcázar, 4-5-1974.
- "Las Piedras humanizadas de Pepi Sánchez". Madrid: El Alcázar, 12-6-1979.
- "El neobarroco de las piedras de Pepi Sánchez". Madrid: El Alcázar, 23-4-1981.
- "Pepi Sánchez: un mundo singular". Madrid: El Alcázar, 26-12-1984.

- Fórmica, Mercedes: "Veinticinco pintoras exponen en Madrid". Madrid: ABC, 28-1- 1968.
- Galí, Francesc: "Pepi Sánchez en Galería Kreisler". Barcelona: El Correo Catalán, 15-1-1983.
- Galve, César: "El arte aglutinante. Una interpretación de la pintura de Pepi Sánchez". Madrid-Palma de Mallorca: Papeles de Son Armadans, 1970. n.º CLXXVII.
- Gálvez Bellido, Eduardo: Un mundo de formas. [Cat. exp. Villaviciosa de Odón], Madrid: Coliseo de la Cultura, Ayuntamiento de Villaviciosa de Odón, 3-2000.
- Gándara, Consuelo de la: "Pepi Sánchez". Madrid: Iberian Daily Sun, 30-5-79.
- García Osuna, Carlos: "Las piedras pintadas de Pepi Sánchez". Madrid: Ya Dominical, 23-12-1984.
- García Picazo, Mercedes: "Navidad y artistas". Madrid: Telva, 1-12-1965.
- García-Viñó Sánchez, Pablo Isidoro: Pepi Sánchez. [Cat. exp. Madrid]. Madrid: Galería Ra del Rey, 1996.
- García Viñó, Manuel: "La Pintura en Sevilla". Madrid: La Estafeta Literaria, 1958. n.º 125.

- "También las piedras cantan villancicos". Madrid: Madrid, 21-12-1966.
- "También las piedras cantan villancicos, en La Crítica de Arte en España", Madrid: Publicaciones Españolas, 1967.
-"Los pintores españoles de la nueva figuración", Pamplona: Nuestro Tiempo, 1968. n.º 164.
- Pintura Española Neofigurativa, Madrid: Guadarrama, 1968.
- "Arte «Medieval» Contemporáneo: Una Manifestación de Contracultura". Pamplona: Nuestro Tiempo, 1976. n.º 262.
- Arte de Hoy Arte del Futuro. Madrid: Ibérico Europea de Ediciones. 1976.
- Algo más que piedras pintadas [Cat. exp. Madrid] Madrid: Galería Altex, 1979.

- García Viñolas, M. A.: "Pepi Sánchez". Madrid: Pueblo, 12-2-1969.

- "Pepi Sánchez". Madrid: Pueblo, 28-12-1972.
- "Pepi Sánchez". Madrid: Pueblo, 8-5-1974.
- "Pepi Sánchez". Madrid: Pueblo, 30-5-1979.
- "Pepi Sánchez". Madrid: Pueblo, 19-3-1980.

- Garrido Conde, María Teresa. "La mujer sevillana en su año internacional: Pepi Sánchez". Sevilla: ABC, 23-5-1975.
- Gaya Nuño, Juan Antonio. La Pintura Española del Siglo XX. Madrid: Ibérico Europea de Ediciones, 1972.
- Giralt, Miracle: "Pepi Sánchez". Barcelona: Avui, 9-4-1978.
- Goñi, Rosa: "Una exposición de piedras de río". Las Palmas de Gran Canaria: Diario de Las Palmas, 8-12-1965 (León: Diario de León, 9-12-1965; San Sebastián: El Diario Vasco, 11-12-1965).
- Gordon, Mercedes. "Cincuenta Belenes hechos con cantos rodados". Madrid: Ya, 2-12-1965.
- Grau, Jorge: Carta a Pepi, [Cat. exp. Madrid] Madrid: Galería Espalter, 1999.
- Guerra, Antonio: "Una interesante exposición de una gran pintora sevillana". Sevilla: El Correo de Andalucía, 5-3-1969.
- Gutiérrez, Fernando: "Pepi Sánchez en el Ateneo". Barcelona: La Prensa, 26-5- 1964.

- "Pepi Sánchez en Laietana". Barcelona: La Vanguardia, 13-3-1978.
- "Las Pictoesculturas de Pepi Sánchez". Barcelona: La Vanguardia, 6-2-1983.

- Hebrero San Martín: "Novedad: las piedras se convierten en figuras de Belén". Madrid: Madrid, 23-11-1965.
- Hierro, José: "Pepi Sánchez". Madrid: El Alcázar, 22-6-1962.

- "Pepi Sánchez". Madrid: El Alcázar, 20-11-1963.
- "Pepi Sánchez". Madrid: El Alcázar, 4-12-1965.
- "Pepi Sánchez". Madrid: Nuevo Diario, 14-1-1973.
- "Pepi Sánchez". Madrid: Tauta, 1-2-1973. n.º 5.
- "Pepi Sánchez". Madrid: Nuevo Diario, 5-5-1974.

- Horia, Vintila: "Visión de un mundo milenario". Madrid: Cuadernos de Arte, Publicaciones Españolas, 1964. n.º 104.

-"Testimonio sobre la Atlántida". Madrid: Semana, 22-2-1969.
- Pepi Sánchez. Artistas españoles contemporáneos. Madrid: Ministerio de Educación y Ciencia, Servicio de Publicaciones, 1971.
-"Pepi Sánchez o la literatura en color". Madrid: El Alcázar, 9-3-1980.
- Dacio, Juan (pseudónimo): "Espectadores del crepúsculo". Madrid: El Alcázar, 12-1985.

- Jiménez Martos, Luís: "La fantasía en la pintura". Madrid: La Estafeta literaria, 8- 1962. n.º 26.

- "Pepi Sánchez y la imaginación" [Cat. exp. Sevilla]. Sevilla: El Corte Inglés, 1987.

- Juana, José María de: "De cómo Pepi Sánchez hace hablar a las piedras". Madrid: Arriba. 19-5-1979.
- Lafita, Teresa: "Pepi Sánchez, cuadros y piedras". Sevilla: El Correo de Andalucía, 1985.
- Latino, Juan: "Momento entrañable de Pepi Sánchez". Córdoba: Córdoba, 8-11-1975.
- Lazo, Mercedes: "Pepi Sánchez". Madrid: Cambio 16, 10-6-1979.
- Leguis, Alma: "Los «cantos rodados» y el color". Madrid: Mundo Obrero, 13-6-1979.
- León Sotelo, Trinidad de: "Pepi Sánchez: la artista que hace hablar a las piedras". Madrid: ABC, 20-5-1982.
- León Tello, F: "Pepi Sánchez". Madrid: Goya, marzo-abril 1973.
- Llorente, Antonio: "Pintura española en la novena provincia; exposición de Pepi Sánchez en la Galería Layetana de Barcelona". Sevilla: Tierras del sur. 15-3-1978. n.º 91.
- Llosent y Marañón, Eduardo: "Joven escuela sevillana". Madrid: Gran mundo, 1954.
- Logroño, Miguel: "Pepi Sánchez, pintora de las cosas ingenuas". Madrid: Revista del Magisterio, 12-1965.

- "Pepi Sánchez: el tiempo en la medida del recuerdo". Madrid: Blanco y Negro, 1974. n.º 3234.

- López Anglada, Luis: "La casa y el mundo de Pepi Sánchez". Madrid: La Estafeta Literaria, 1-3-1970. n.º 439.
- Lorente, Manuel: "Pepi Sánchez, un conmovedor universo tan fantástico como real". Sevilla: ABC, 25-5-1978.

- "Pepi Sánchez ha hecho hablar a las piedras". Sevilla: ABC, 20-7-1979.
- "Los ríos y el mar trabajan para Pepi Sánchez". Sevilla: ABC, 14-12-1979.
- "Dibujos y piedras de Pepi Sánchez". Sevilla: ABC, 21-5-1980.
- "Las lizopinturas de Pepi Sánchez". Sevilla: ABC, 6-5-1981.
- "Simplemente piedras, pero de Pepi Sánchez". Sevilla: ABC, 9-12-1981.
- "Pepi Sánchez en Madrid ". Sevilla: ABC, 11-1-1985.
- "Pepi Sánchez". Sevilla: ABC, 22-3-1985.

- Maia, Altino: "Duas pintoras españolas: Lola e Pepi Sánchez". Porto (Portugal): Diario do Norte, 1-5-1954.
- Manrique de Lara, José Gerardo: "Pepi Sánchez desde su penúltimo sueño". Madrid: La estafeta Literaria, 1976. n.º 587.
- Manzano, Rafael: "Pepi Sánchez y su mundo onírico". Barcelona: Solidaridad Nacional, 4-6-1964.

- "Lizopinturas de Pepi Sánchez". Barcelona: El Noticiero Universal, 13-1-1983.

- Marferola, José: "Pepi Sánchez y su mundo mágico". Santander: Alerta. 4-6-1974.
- Marín Medina, José: Piedras con pinturas, una meditación. [Cat. exp. Sevilla] Sevilla: Caja de Ahorros Provincial de San Fernando de Sevilla, 1985.

- Las Lizopinturas de Pepi Sánchez, Alicante: Ediciones Rembrandt, 1980.

- Marsá, Ángel: "Pepi Sánchez". Barcelona: El Correo Catalán, 25-3-1978.
- Martín Abril, José Luis: "Las piedras pintadas". Valladolid: Diario Regional, 2-12-1965.
- Martínez Cerezo, Antonio: Pepi Sánchez en el país de los mil y un sueños. [Cat. exp. Santander] Santander: Galería Sur, 1974.

- "El mundo alegórico de Pepi Sánchez". Bilbao: La Gaceta del Norte, 12-6-1974.
-"Pepi Sánchez" en Arte: Diccionario de pintores españoles. Segunda mitad del siglo veinte. Madrid: Época, 1997.

- Martinez de Lahidalga, Rosa: "Piedras pintadas de Pepi Sánchez". Madrid: Auto Club, 1-1970

-"Pepi Sánchez". Madrid: La Estafeta Literaria. 1-5-1974. n.º 539.
-"Pintores andaluces de la fantasía en París". Madrid: España cultural. 15-3-1975, n.º 6.
-"Exposición de Pepi Sánchez en Barcelona". Madrid: Tribuna médica. 14-4-1978.
-"Dibujos de Pepi Sánchez". Madrid: Tribuna médica. 18-4-1980. n.º 846.

- Mateos, Aurora: "Las piedras se vuelven villancicos en las manos de Pepi Sánchez". Madrid: Teresa. 12-1965. n.º 144.

- "Un escritor: Manuel García Viñó. Una pintora: Pepi Sánchez". Madrid: Teresa, 5-1969. n.º 185.
- "Pepi Sánchez en el Ateneo de Madrid". Madrid: Galería. n.º 334.

- Mateos, Lourdes: "Mi vida con... Manuel García Viñó. Pepi Sánchez, pintora". Madrid: El Alcázar, 25-11-1972.

- "Óleos y dibujos de Pepi Sánchez". Madrid: El Alcázar, 16-12-1972.

- Meliá, Josep: "Los dibujos de Pepi Sánchez". Madrid: Bellas Artes 70, 1974. n.º 34.
- Molleda, Mercedes: "Exhibitions in Spain". Nueva York: Pictures on exhibit. 1-1964. vol. XXVII, n.º 4.
- Mon, Fernando: "Pepi Sánchez, Noticia de Vintila Horia". La Coruña: El Ideal Gallego. 4-3-1973.
- Montesinos, Rafael: "Anunciación de Pepi Sánchez". Málaga, Caracola, 5-1963. n.º 127.
- Montoya: "Pepi Sánchez, una sevillana que vuelve a su tierra para exponer". Sevilla: ABC. 15-3-1985.
- Moreno Galván, José María: Pepi Sánchez. [Cat. exp.Madrid]. Madrid: Galería Estilo, 1954.

- "El nuevo Arte Religioso". Barcelona: Gaceta Ilustrada, 21-3-1959.
- Introducción a la pintura española contemporánea. Madrid: Publicaciones Españolas, 1960.
- "Pepi Sánchez". Madrid: Artes, 1963. n.º 46.
- "Pepi Sánchez: pedruscos animados". Madrid: Triunfo, 1979. n.º 853.

- Narvión, Pilar. "Sevilla tiene otra cara. Se la han pintado Pepi y Loli Sánchez con ayuda de Carmen Laffón". Madrid: Pueblo, 3-1955.
- Navarro Martín, José Félix: "La pintura tiene nombre de mujer: Mari Pepa y Lolita Sánchez Díaz, dos jóvenes pintoras sevillanas". Madrid: Dígame, 1957.
- Olmedo, Manuel: "Las pintoras María Josefa y Dolores Sánchez". Sevilla: ABC, 8-6-1955.

- "Pepi Sánchez en el Ateneo". Sevilla: ABC, 16-6-1957.
- "Exposición de mosaicos en el Ateneo". Sevilla: ABC, 30-5-1958.
- "Pinturas y grabados en el Club La Rábida". Sevilla: ABC, 29-2-1964.
- "La pintura fascinante de Pepi Sánchez". Sevilla: ABC, 6-3-1969.
- "Las piedras pitadas de Pepi Sánchez". Sevilla: ABC, 18-12-1959.
- "El realismo poético de Pepi Sánchez". Sevilla: ABC, 10-1-1973.
- "El realismo mágico de Pepi Sánchez". Sevilla: ABC, 29-5-1975.

- Ortiz, Florencia: "El doble triunfo de Pepi Sánchez". Sevilla: El Correo de Andalucía, 14-5-1967. (Oviedo: La voz de Asturias, 21-5-1967; Logroño: Nueva Rioja, 5-1967; Santander: Hoja del lunes. 31-7-1967. Marbella: Sol de España, 20-2-1968; León: Diario de León, 5-3-1968; Alcoy-Gandía: Ciudad, 5-3-1968; La Coruña: El ideal Gallego, 16-5-1968).
- Parodi, Rafael: "Las mujeres en las Artes Plásticas ". Cádiz: Hoja del lunes, 3-7-1978.
- Pérez Bendito, Manuel: "La pintura de Pepi Sánchez ". Madrid: Senda, 1973.
- Pérez Guerra, José: "El mundo de Pepi Sánchez". Madrid: Cinco días, 18-12-1984.

- "Pepi Sánchez y su mundo de maravillas". Madrid: Cinco días, 9-4-1985.

- Piñero, Fernando: "Belenes y pinceles ". La Coruña: La voz de Galicia, 24-9-1965.
- Prados de la Plaza, Francisco: "Pepi Sánchez obliga a las piedras a ser esculturas polícromas". Madrid: Ya, 14-6-1979.
- Poo San Román: "Óleos de Pepi Sánchez". Santander: El Diario Montañés, 12-6-1974.
- Popovici, Cirilo. "Pepi Sánchez". Madrid: S.P., 20-4-1958.

- "Pepi Sánchez". Madrid: S.P., 1-1-1964. n.º 225.
- "Pepi Sánchez". Madrid: S.P., 16-3-1969. n.º 442.
- "Pepi Sánchez: pedruscos animados". Madrid: S.P., 28-12-1969.
- "Las fábulas de Pepi Sánchez". Barcelona: Batik, 10-12-1974

- Puente, Joaquín de la: "Pepi Sánchez", Madrid: La estafeta literaria, 26-4-1958. n.º 126.

- "Premio de la crítica". Madrid: La estafeta literaria, 21-6-1958. n.º 134.
- Un arte lúdico y mágico. [Cat. exp. Sevilla] Sevilla: Caja de Ahorros Provincial de San Fernando de Sevilla, 1985.

- Quiñones, Fernando: Pepi Sánchez. [Cat. Exp. Madrid]. Madrid: Alcances 78. 1978.
- Ramírez de Lucas, Juan: "Pepi Sánchez, pintora de los mágicos sueños infantiles". Madrid: El Español, 5-8-1962.

- "La pintora Pepi Sánchez". Madrid: Familia Española, 11-1962.

- Requena, José maría: "Lienzos con títulos certeros". Sevilla: El correo de Andalucía. 6-3-1969.
- Ribera, Ángel: "Figuras de nacimientos hechas con piedras del camino". Madrid: Dígame, 18-12-1984.
- Rica, Carlos de la: "Las metamorfosis de Pepi Sánchez". Cuenca: Diario de Cuenca, 2-6-1979.
- Rio, Emilio del: "El otro mundo de Pepi Sánchez". Valladolid, Diario Regional, 20-5-1976.
- Ríos Ruiz, Manuel: "Pepi Sánchez y sus nuevas piedras preciosas". Madrid: La Estafeta Literaria, 15-12-1969. n.º 434.
- Rodríguez Alcalde, Leopoldo: "Pepi Sánchez en «Sur»". Santander: Alerta, 5-6-1974.
- Rojas, Carlos: "El aprendizaje de los sueños en la pintura de Pepi Sánchez". Madrid: Cuadernos de Arte, Publicaciones Españolas, 1969. n.º 123.
- Rubio, Javier: "Pepi Sánchez". Madrid: ABC, 18-12-1985.
- Sáez, Ramón: "Pepi Sánchez". Madrid: Arriba, 21-4-1974.
- Salido Roig, Jesús: "Pepi Sánchez nos devuelve algo". Cádiz: Diario de Cádiz, 2-7-1978.
- Salinas, Florinda: "Pepi Sánchez: la pintura idealista ". Madrid: Telva, 15-3-1985. n.º 504.
- Sánchez Camargo, M.: "Pepi Sánchez". Madrid: Hoja del Lunes, 29-11-1965.
- Sánchez Marín, Venancio: "Pintura religiosa y pintura profana". Madrid: Arbor, 1958. n.º 149.

- "Pepi Sánchez". Madrid: Goya, julio-agosto 1962. n.º 49.
- "La lozanía imaginativa de Pepi Sánchez". Madrid: La Estafeta Literaria, 1962. n.º 244.
- "La mágica realidad de Pepi Sánchez". Madrid: Goya, septiembre-diciembre 1963. n.º 56-57.
- "Pepi Sánchez". Madrid: Goya, mayo-junio1974. n.º 120.

- Sánchez de Muniain, Carmen: "El rico mundo legendario de una pintora", Madrid: Revista, 1-1964.
- Sánchez Pedrote, Enrique: "II Salón de la Joven Escuela Sevillana". Madrid: Ateneo, 1952.

- "Vuelve a florecer la vieja tradición del mosaico". Tánger: España. 5-6-1958.

- Sandoval, Juan Antonio: "Pepi Sánchez, poesía en colores". Santander: El diario Montañés, 10-6-1974.
- Santana, Lázaro: "Una exposición de Pepi Sánchez". Las Palmas de Gran Canarias: Diario de Las Palmas, 3-1-1973.
- Santos Torroella, Rafael: "Pepi Sánchez en Galería Laietana". Barcelona: El Noticiero Universal, 4-4-1978.
- Serrano, Eugenia: "Pepi Sánchez o cuando pintan las mujeres". Madrid: El Alcázar, 24-2-1955.
- Solano: "Pepi Sánchez, una pintora total". Córdoba: Córdoba-9-1975.
- Soto Verges, Rafael: "El magicismo en Pepi Sánchez", Madrid: Artes, 1963. n.º 45.
- Terragui, Antonio: "Dos hermanas maravillosas". Rafaela, Argentina: Vida rural, 31-6-1959.
- Tiján, Leonor: "Pepi Sánchez pasa su vida entre pinceles y niños". Madrid: Ama, 1-1-1966.
- Trenas, Julio: "Pepi Sánchez: la piedra como soporte pictórico". Madrid: Jano, 15-5-1981. n.º 471.
- Umbral, Francisco: "Pepi Sánchez". Madrid: La Estafeta Literaria, 18-12-1965. n.º 333.
- Vallés Rovira: "Pepi Sánchez". Barcelona: Tele Exprés, 31-3-1978.
- Villagómez: "Pepi Sánchez". Madrid: La Codorniz, 4-1-1970. n.º 1468.
- Villar, Arturo del: "La obra de Pepi Sánchez". Santander: Alerta, 24-3-1973.
- Yanes, Carmen: "El artista y la sociedad. María Antonia Dans, Pepi Sánchez y Antonio Zarco". Madrid: Crítica, 9-1973. n.º 608.
- Zoido, Antonio: "Las lizopinturas de Pepi Sánchez". Badajoz: Hoy, 26-4-1981.

-"Pepi Sánchez y la singularidad de su arte". [Cat. exp. Madrid]. Madrid: Galería Alfama, 1992.
