= Los trabajos de Persiles y Sigismunda =

Novel by Miguel de Cervantes Saavedra

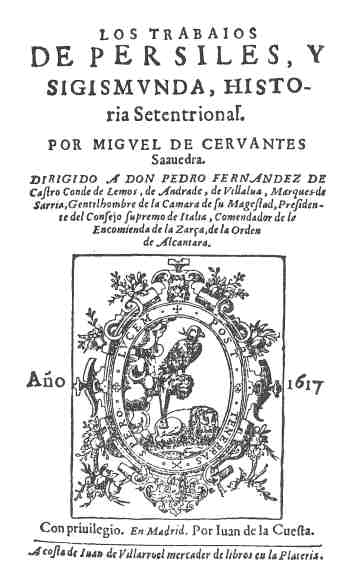
- Title page of first edition (1617)
- Author: Miguel de Cervantes Saavedra
- Original title: Los trabajos de Persiles y Sigismunda
- Language: Spanish
- Genre: Romance novel
- Publication place: Spain
- Media type: Print

Los trabajos de Persiles y Sigismunda ("The Travails of Persiles and Sigismunda") is a romance by Miguel de Cervantes Saavedra, his last work and one that stands in opposition to the more famous novel Don Quixote by its embrace of the fantastic rather than the commonplace. While Cervantes is known primarily for Don Quixote, widely regarded as one of the foremost classic novels of all time, he himself believed the Persiles, as it is commonly called, to be his crowning achievement. He completed it only three days before his death, and it was posthumously published in 1617.

The generally accepted idea about the novel's orthodoxy as a neo-classical and Catholic epic romance has been challenged in two books by Michael Nerlich (2005) and Michael Armstrong-Roche (2009). More recently (2016), in a volume of studies celebrating the 400th anniversary of the novel's publication, the editor Mercedes Alcalá Galán points out that new interpretations of the Persiles have led to an expansion of its meaning, and that her volume emphasises the novel's poetic legacy, its inventiveness, and above all the appeal of the writer's creative passion, "el contagio de la pasión literaria con la que fue escrita." The latest attempt to read something new into the novel makes the claim that beneath the disguise of the heroes as Periandro and Auristela there are further surprising identites, both historical and religious, waiting to be discovered.

To mark the 400th anniversary, the Real Academia Española has brought out a new edition (2017), seventy-five pages of which can be found at: https://www.rae.es/sites/default/files/Hojear_Persiles_y_Sigismunda.pdf
