= José Villegas (painter) =

Spanish painter (1844–1921)

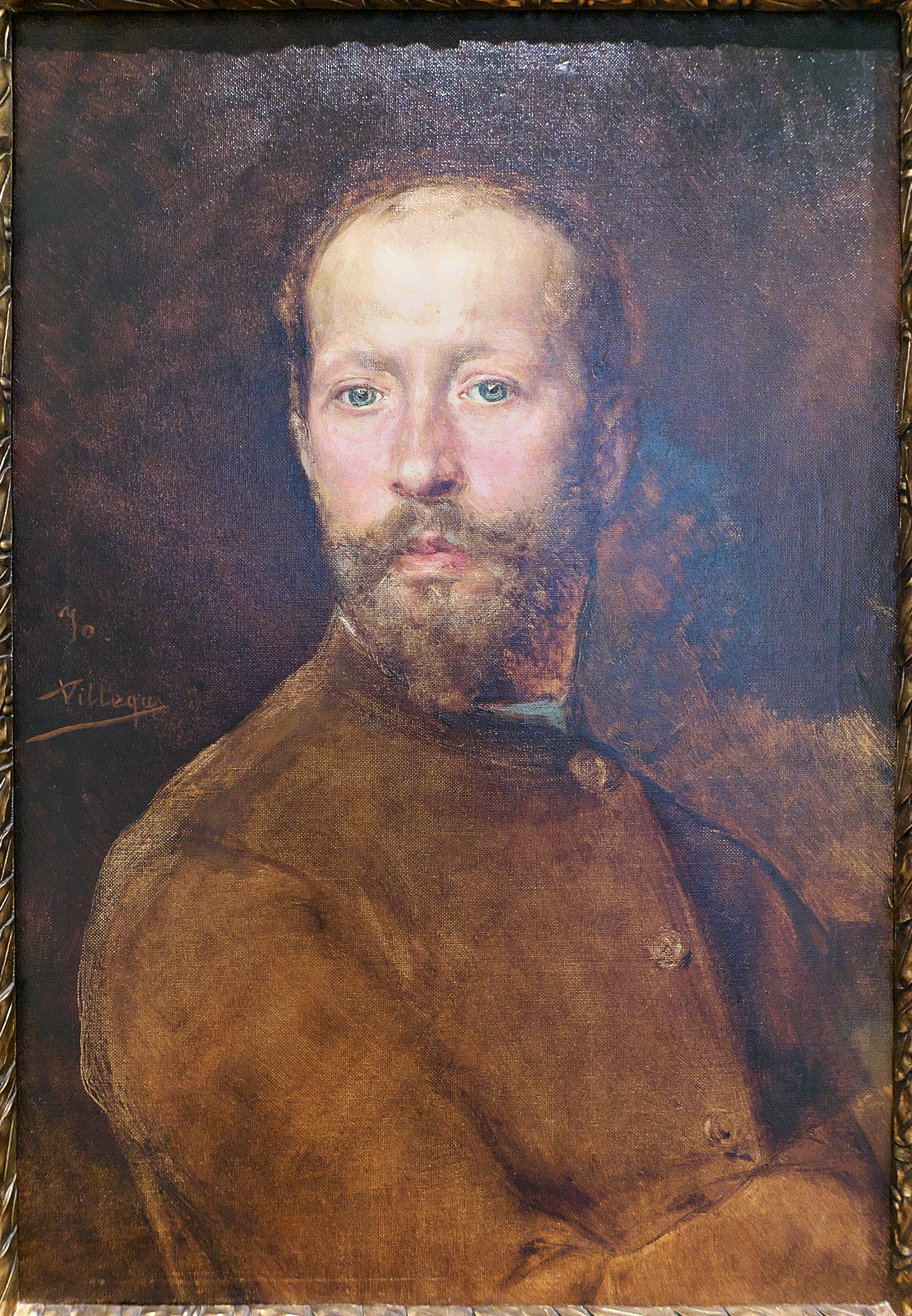
- Self-portrait, 1875-76
- Born: José Villegas Cordero; 26 August 1844; Seville, Spain
- Died: 9 November 1921 (aged 77); Madrid
- Education: José María Romero López; Escuela de Bellas Artes de Sevilla
- Movement: Costumbrismo; Orientalist

José Villegas Cordero (26 August 1844, Seville – 9 November 1921, Madrid) was a Spanish painter of historical, genre and costumbrista scenes.

== Early life ==
His father ran a barbershop, and his family had their doubts about an artistic career. But, in 1860, when he was still only sixteen, he sold one of his works at the "Exposición Sevillana" for 2,000 Reales. This changed his family's mind and he was apprenticed to the painter José María Romero López, staying with him for two years before enrolling at the Escuela de Bellas Artes de Sevilla, where he studied with Eduardo Cano.

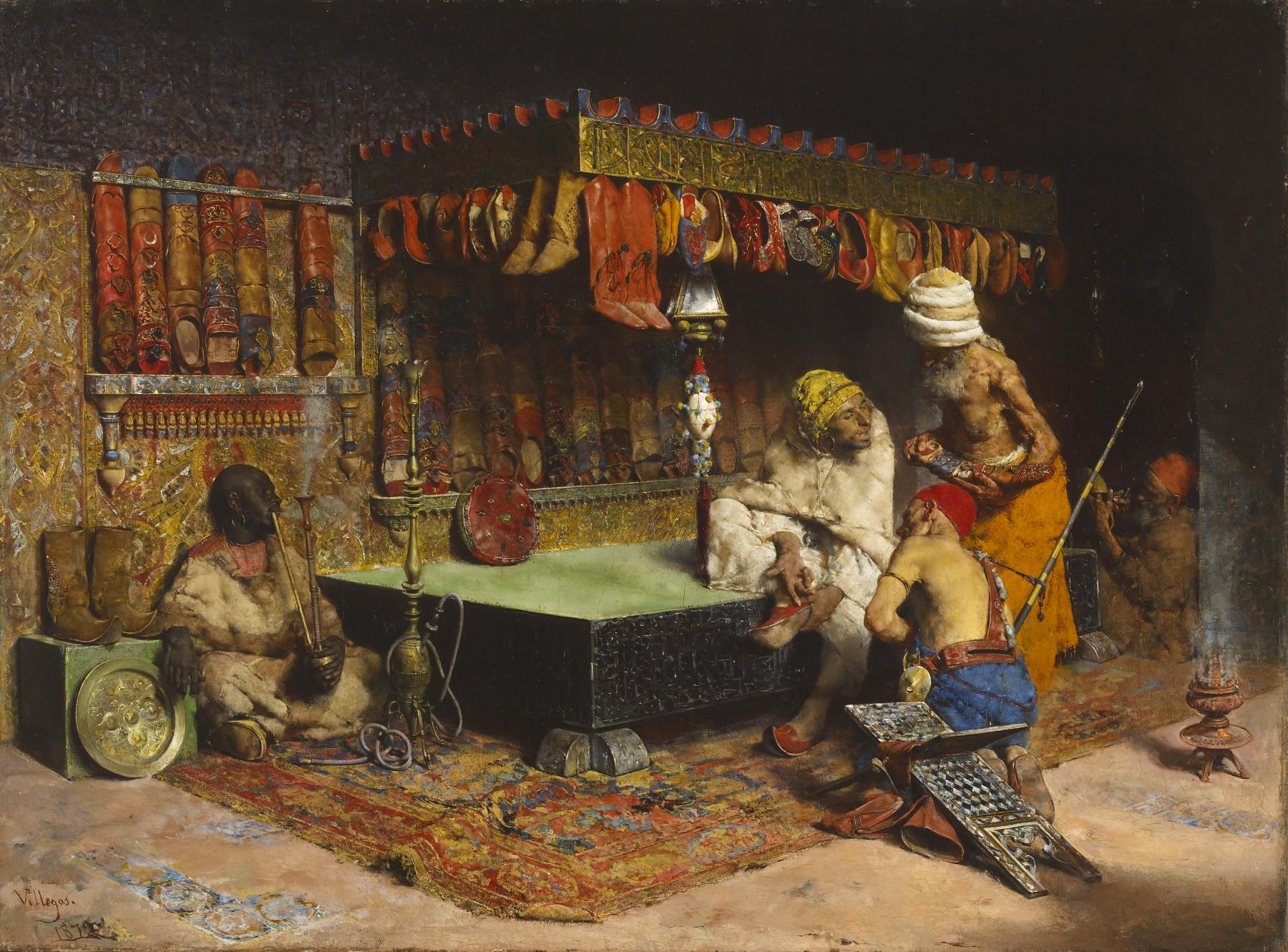
The Slipper Merchant in Morocco (1872)

In 1867, he travelled to Madrid, where found work in the studios of Federico de Madrazo. While there, he spent time at the Museo del Prado, copying the works of Velázquez to perfect his technique. Finally, inspired by the works of the Orientalist painter Marià Fortuny, he organized an excursion to Morocco.

Near the end of 1868, with financial assistance from his family, he decided to visit Rome with some of his friends and spent time in the workshop of Eduardo Rosales. It was there that he created his first costumbrista works, which proved to be very popular. He also began painting Orientalist scenes based on the numerous sketches he brought back from Morocco, and returned there briefly to collect more material. The vogue for these types of paintings was soon at its high point, and his works were widely promoted by the Bosch y Hernández galleries.

== Career ==
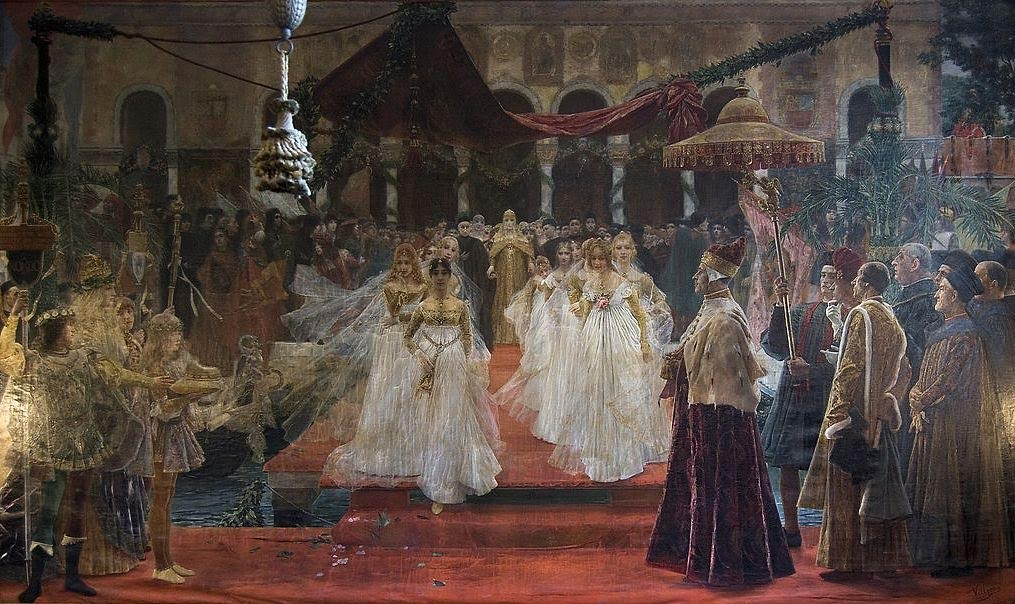
The triumph of the Dogaresa Foscari (1892)

After 1877, he often lived in Venice and produced works designed to be of interest to wealthy American buyers. By 1887, he was able to build a house, which he designed himself. It soon became a gathering place for high society. He also began accepting a small number of students.

In 1878, the Spanish Senate commissioned him to paint a large-scale historical work on the subject "Hernán Cortés' interview with Moctezuma". The commission was cancelled four years later, but it inspired him to embark on a series of historical paintings. Later, a Dutch publishing company approached several major European artists to produce illustrations for a Magna Biblia. Villegas was entrusted with depicting the prophecies in the Book of Isaiah.

The 1890s began quietly but, in 1896, his younger brother Ricardo (who was also an artist) drowned after he fell off a boat on the Guadalquivir. This plunged him into depression and he began painting works of an ecclesiastical nature. Two years later, he was appointed Director of the "Academia española de Bellas Artes en Roma".

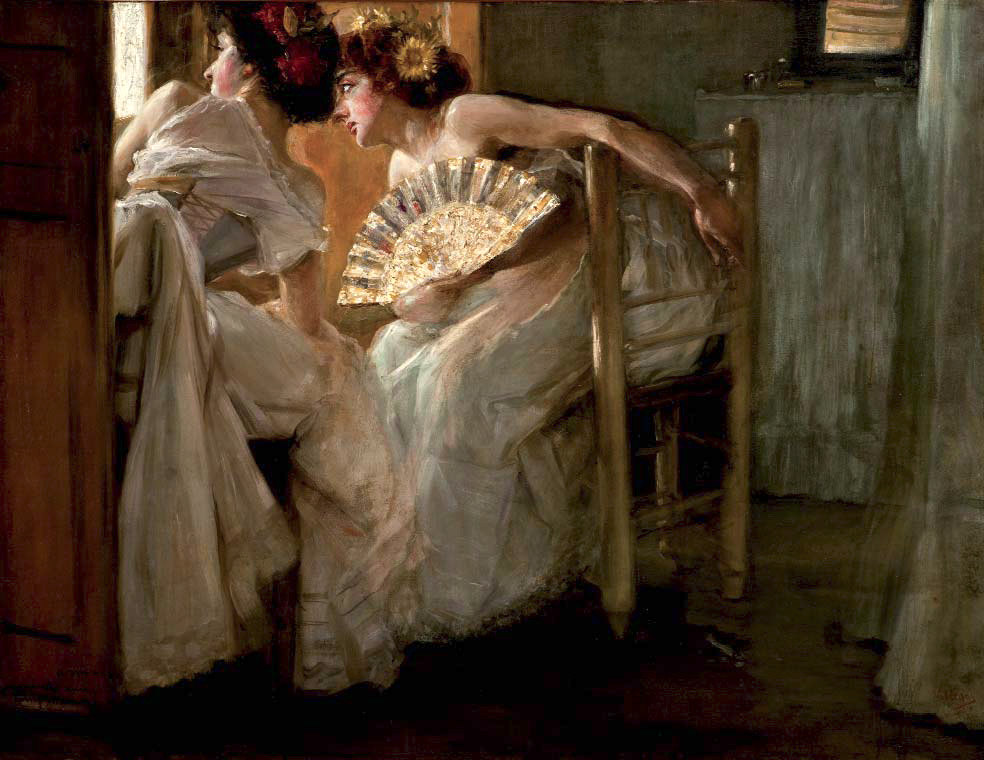
Women at the Window (date unknown)

In 1901, in recognition of his work there, he was named Director of the Museo del Prado; abandoning his studio in Rome and returning to Madrid. He held that post until 1918 and presided over a major reorganization. During that time, he also established a new reputation as a portrait painter. He resigned due to negative publicity following a jewelry theft by one of the museum's guards.

== See also ==
- List of Orientalist artists
- Orientalism
