= Real Academia de Bellas Artes de Santa Isabel de Hungría =

Coordinates: 37.3877°N 5.9911°W

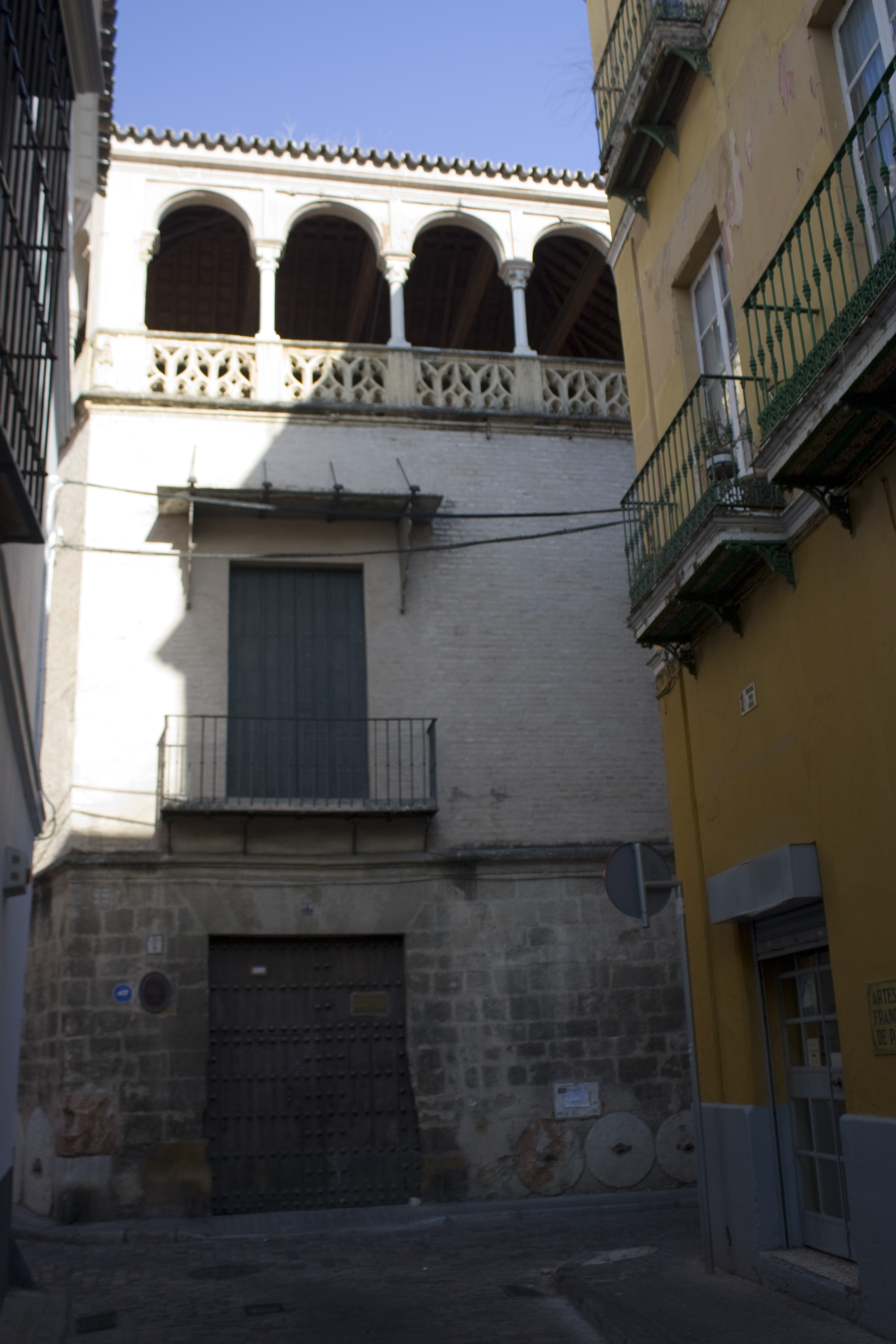
The House of the Pinelos (Casa de los Pinelo) is a mansion of the 16th century decorated with millstones

The Real Academia de Bellas Artes de Santa Isabel de Hungría (Royal Academy of Fine Arts of Saint Isabel of Hungary) is located in the Casa-Palacio de los Pinelo in central Seville, Spain. It is divided into six sections: Architecture, Sculpture, Painting, Music, Archaeology, Decorative Arts and Performing and Audiovisual Arts.

It was founded in 1660. Notable members include; Ana María Vicent Zaragoza, Andrés Rossi, José Hernández and Pepi Sánchez.
