= Monument to Cánovas del Castillo =

Monument in Palacio, Madrid, Spain

- Monumento a Cánovas del Castillo
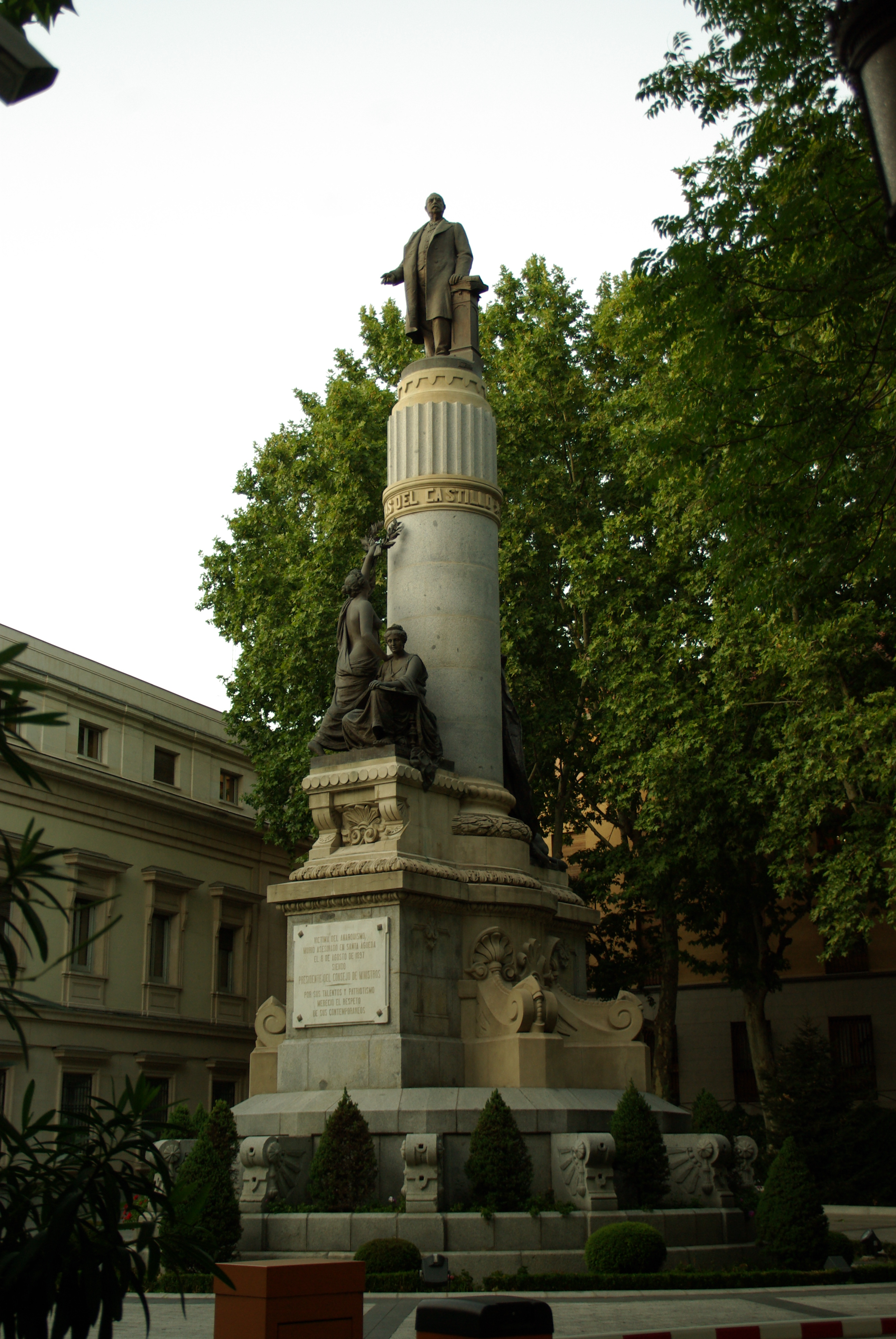
- 40.420942°N 3.711528°W
- Location: Plaza de la Marina Española, Madrid, Spain
- Designer: Pedestal: José Grases Riera; Statues: Joaquín Bilbao
- Opening date: 1 January 1901
- Dedicated to: Antonio Cánovas del Castillo

The Monument to Cánovas del Castillo (Spanish: Monumento a Cánovas del Castillo) is an instance of public art located in Madrid, Spain. The monument consists of a bronze statue of Antonio Cánovas del Castillo by Joaquín Bilbao at the top of a pedestal designed by José Grases Riera that features additional sculptural elements by Bilbao.

== History and description ==
It was funded via popular subscription. It is located at the Plaza de la Marina Española, next to the Palace of the Senate.

Following the description by Carlos Luis de Cuenca y Velasco, the monument features a lower circular basement. Over the first course, it lies a body with 12 drawers decorated with ornamental plants, featuring some buttresses on its superior limit. In the middle body, there are two bronze sculptural groups placed in two ledges: on the front ledge there is a seated statue—History—writing the remarkable facts of the Cánovas' life in a book and a second standing statue—Glory—that leans with one hand on History and pulls with the other hand a laurel wreath touching the name of Cánovas, carved on the column emerging from the central body; on the back ledge there is a bronze trophy formed by a lion, the Spanish coat of arms and a flag. The truncated column is topped by a statue of Cánovas in an oratorical attitude, advancing his right arm while resting his left hand on a book placed on a pedestal.

It was inaugurated on 1 January 1901.
