= Amoros =

Amorós or Amoros is a surname. Notable people with the name include:

- Antonio Amorós (1927–2004), Spanish athlete
- Celia Amorós (born 1944), Spanish philosopher, essayist, and feminist
- Ciril Amorós (born 1904), Spanish footballer
- Eduardo Amorós (born 1943), Spanish equestrian
- Georgina Amorós (born 1998), Spanish actress
- Grimanesa Amorós (born 1962), Peruvian-American artist
- Juan Amorós (1936–2016), Spanish cinematographer
- Juan Carlos Amorós, Spanish football manager
- Manuel Amoros (born 1962), French former footballer
- Marta Amorós (born 1970), Spanish synchronized swimmer
- Sandy Amorós (1930–1992), Major League Baseball player from Cuba
- Sébastien Amoros (born 1995), French footballer
- Vanesa Amorós (born 1982), Spanish former handball player

== See also ==
- Francisco Amorós y Ondeano (1770–1848), Marquis of Sotelo, promoter of gymnastics
- José Alcoverro y Amorós (1835–1908), Spanish sculptor
