= Monument to Alfonso XII =

Monument by José Grases Riera in Madrid, Spain

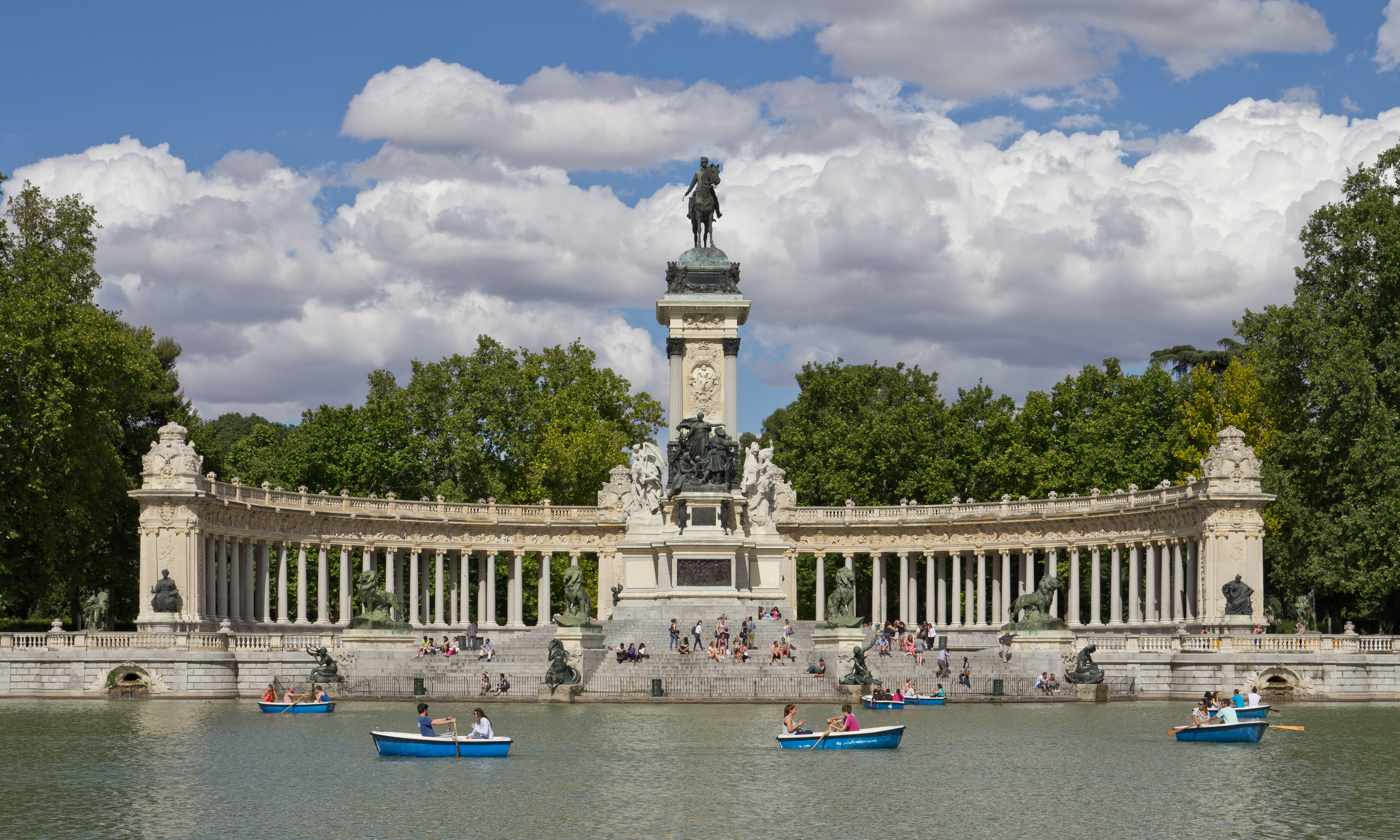
- Interactive map of Monument to Alfonso XII
- Location: Buen Retiro Park, Madrid, Spain
- Coordinates: 40°25′02″N 3°40′59″W
- Designer: José Grases Riera
- Material: Marble and bronze
- Length: 86 metres (282 ft)
- Width: 58 metres (190 ft)
- Height: 30 metres (98 ft)
- Opening date: 1922

The Monument to Alfonso XII (Spanish: Monumento a Alfonso XII) is located in Buen Retiro Park (El Retiro), Madrid, Spain. The monument is situated on the east edge of an artificial lake near the center of the park.

In 1902, a national contest was held to design a monument for King Alfonso XII at the initiative of the Queen Mother Maria Christina of Austria. The winner was the architect José Grases Riera, whose design consisted of a grand colonnade alongside a pond in El Retiro, with several sculptures surrounding an equestrian statue of the king, with everything constructed in bronze and marble.

Grases Riera died in 1919 with work still in progress. The architect Teodoro Anasagasti took control of the project without modifying the original design. More than twenty sculptors worked on the project. The monument, financed by a popular collection, was inaugurated on June 6, 1922. It was the first of many commemorative statues (by artists such as Mariano Benlliure, Josep Clarà, and Mateo Inurria) that were added to parks in Spain over the last century.

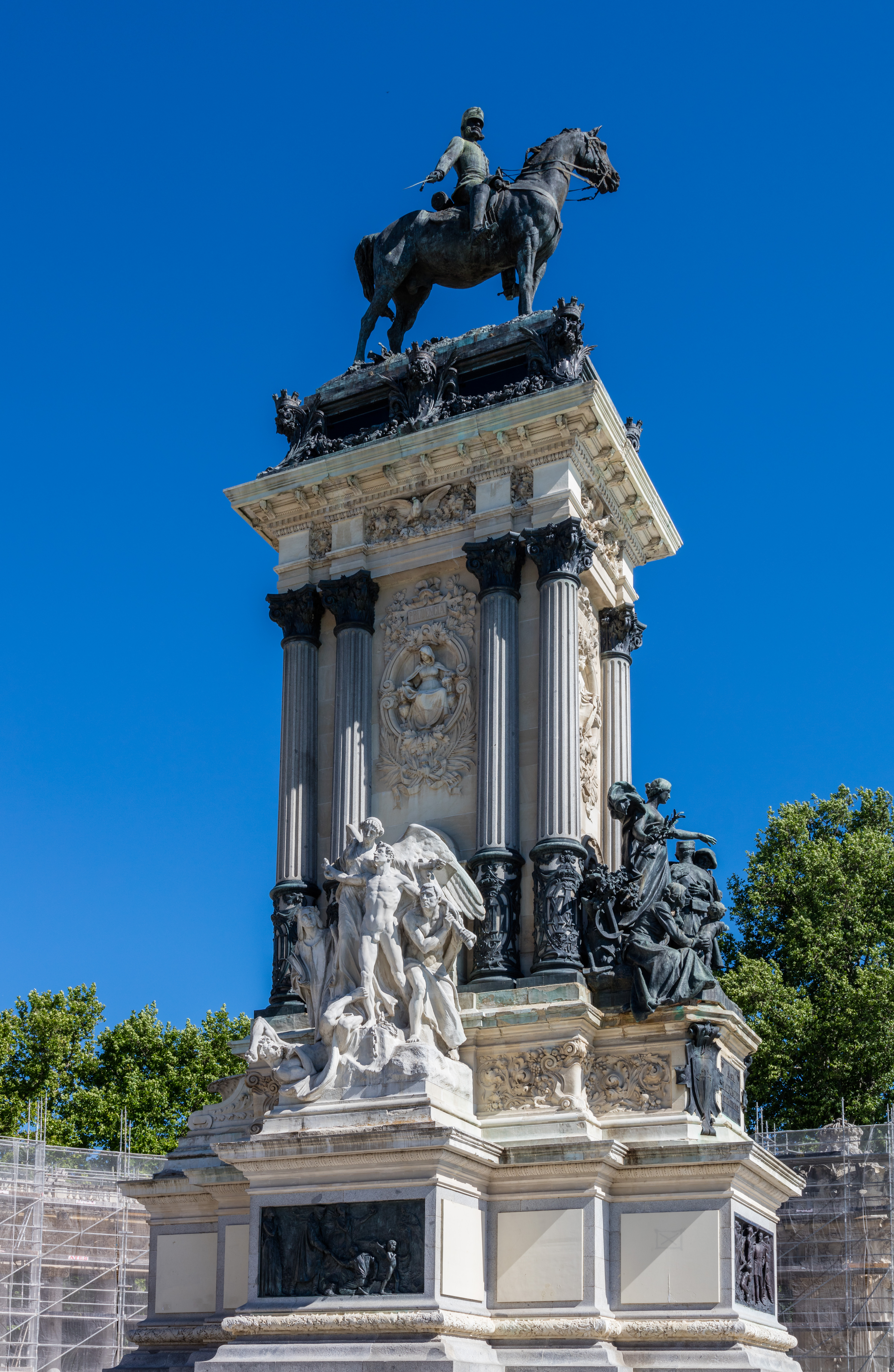
Detail of the equestrian sculpture of the king.

The monument is 30 meters high, 86 meters long, and 58 meters wide. At its center is the equestrian statue of King Alfonso XII, cast in bronze, which was created by Benlliure in 1904. In the central base of the monument are the statues "La Paz" ("Peace") by Miquel Blay, "La Libertad" ("Freedom") by Aniceto Marinas and "El Progreso" ("Progress") by Miguel Ángel Trilles. In the pedestal, there are three bronze reliefs. Stairs descend from the central monument toward the lake, with four stone lions carved by Agapit Vallmitjana i Abarca and Pedro Estany. Under the pedestals, in bronze, are four mermaids sculpted by Antonio Parera Saurina, Rafael Atché, Antonio Coll y Pi, and Antoni Alsina. There are also two lions in each of the lateral access paths to the semicircle; these were carved by Francisco Javier Escudero Lozano, Antonio Bofill, Eusebi Arnau, and Campmany. At each side of the central access way to the colonnade are "El Ejército" ("The Army") by José Montserrat and "La Marina" ("The Navy") by Mateo Inurrria. In the inside of the monument, facing the lake, are the bronze sculptures "Las Ciencias" ("Sciences") by Manel Fuxà, "La Agricultura" ("Agriculture") by José Alcoverro, "Las Artes" ("The Arts") by Joaquín Bilbao, and "La Industria" ("Industry") by Josep Clarà. The ornamentation of the friezes and the central base was done by Pedro Estany.
