= Alfonso XII =

King of Spain from 1874 to 1885

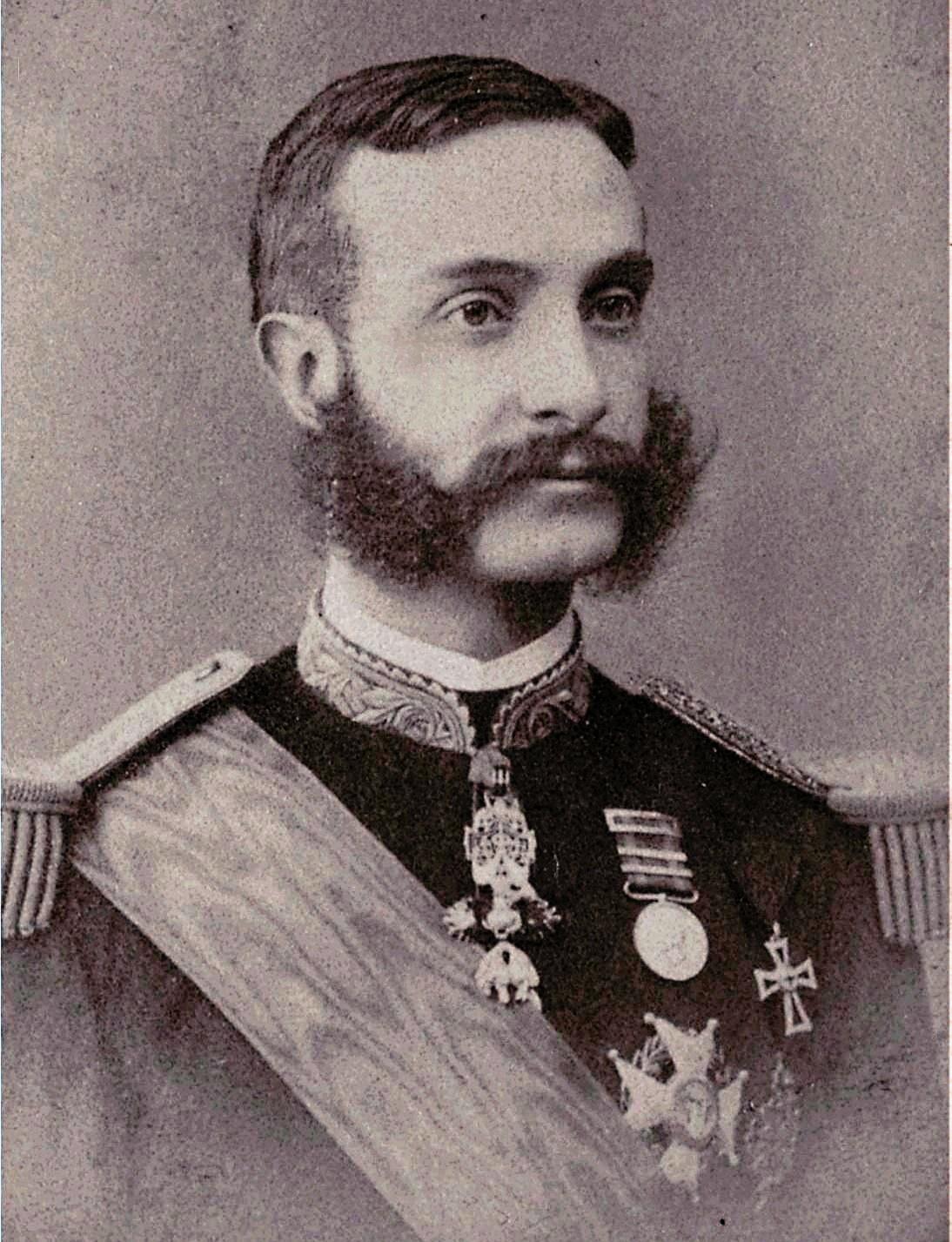
- Formal portrait, 1875

King of Spain
- Reign: 29 December 1874 – 25 November 1885
- Enthronement: 14 January 1875
- Predecessor: Amadeo I (1873)
- Successor: Alfonso XIII
- Born: 28 November 1857; Royal Palace of Madrid, Madrid, Spain
- Died: 25 November 1885 (aged 27); Royal Palace of El Pardo, Madrid, Spain
- Burial: El Escorial
- Spouses: María de las Mercedes of Orléans (m. 1878; died 1878) Maria Christina of Austria (m. 1879)
- Issue Detail: María de las Mercedes, Princess of Asturias; Infanta María Teresa, Princess of Bavaria; Alfonso XIII
Names
- Alfonso Francisco de Asís Fernando Pío Juan María de la Concepción Gregorio Pelayo de Borbón y Borbón
- House: Bourbon
- Father: Francisco de Asís, Duke of Cádiz
- Mother: Isabella II
- Religion: Catholicism

Alfonso XII (Note: In the languages of Spain, his name was: Aragonese: Alifonso XII; Asturian: Alfonsu XII; Basque: Alfontso XII; Catalan: Alfons XII; Occitan: Anfós XII; Galician: Afonso XII; Spanish: Alfonso XII) (Alfonso Francisco de Asís Fernando Pío Juan María de la Concepción Gregorio Pelayo de Borbón y Borbón; 28 November 1857 – 25 November 1885), also known as El Pacificador (Spanish: the Peacemaker), was King of Spain from 29 December 1874 to his death in 1885.

After the Glorious Revolution of 1868 deposed his mother Isabella II from the throne, Alfonso studied in Austria and France. His mother abdicated in his favour in 1870, and he returned to Spain as king in 1874 following a military coup against the First Spanish Republic. Alfonso died aged 27 in 1885, leaving his pregnant widow, Maria Christina of Austria, as regent of Spain. Their son, Alfonso XIII, became king upon his birth the following year. Maria Christina continued as regent until Alfonso XIII came of age in 1902.

== Paternity, early life, and exile ==
Alfonso was born in Madrid as the eldest son of the reigning Queen Isabella II on 28 November 1857. His official father, Isabella's husband Francisco de Asís, has been generally viewed as effeminate, impotent, or homosexual, leading writers to question Alfonso's biological paternity. There is speculation that his biological father may have been Enrique Puigmoltó y Mayans, a captain of the guard. Others have assigned the fatherhood to Federico Puig Romero, a colonel who was murdered under unclear circumstances in 1866. The relationship of the queen with Puigmoltó was so much of a public hearsay at the time that Francisco de Asís initially refused to attend the baptism ceremony of Alfonso (the heir apparent), though he was eventually forced to do so. These rumours were used as political propaganda against Alfonso by the Carlists, and he came to be widely nicknamed "Puigmoltejo" in reference to his supposed father. His mother's accession had created a second cause of instability, the Carlist Wars, where the supporters of Don Carlos, Count of Molina as King of Spain rose to have him enthroned.

In addition, within the context of the post-Napoleonic restorations and revolutions which engulfed Europe and the Americas, both the Carlistas and the Isabelino conservatives were opposed to the new Napoleonic constitutional system. Much like in Britain, which subtracted itself from the liberal constitutional process, Spanish conservatives wanted to continue with the traditional Organic Laws, such as the Fuero Juzgo, the Novísima Recopilación and the Partidas of Alfonso X. This led to a third cause of instability, the independence of most of the American possessions, recognized between 1823 and 1850.

When the Revolution of 1868 forced Queen Isabella and her husband to leave Spain, Alfonso accompanied them to Paris. From there, he was sent to the Theresianum in Vienna to continue his studies. On 25 June 1870, he was recalled to Paris, where his mother abdicated in his favour in the presence of a number of Spanish nobles who had tied their fortunes to those of the exiled queen. He assumed the name Alfonso XII, for although no king of united Spain had borne the name "Alfonso", the Spanish monarchy was regarded as continuous with the more ancient monarchy represented by the 11 kings of Asturias, León and Castile also named Alfonso.

== The Republic ==
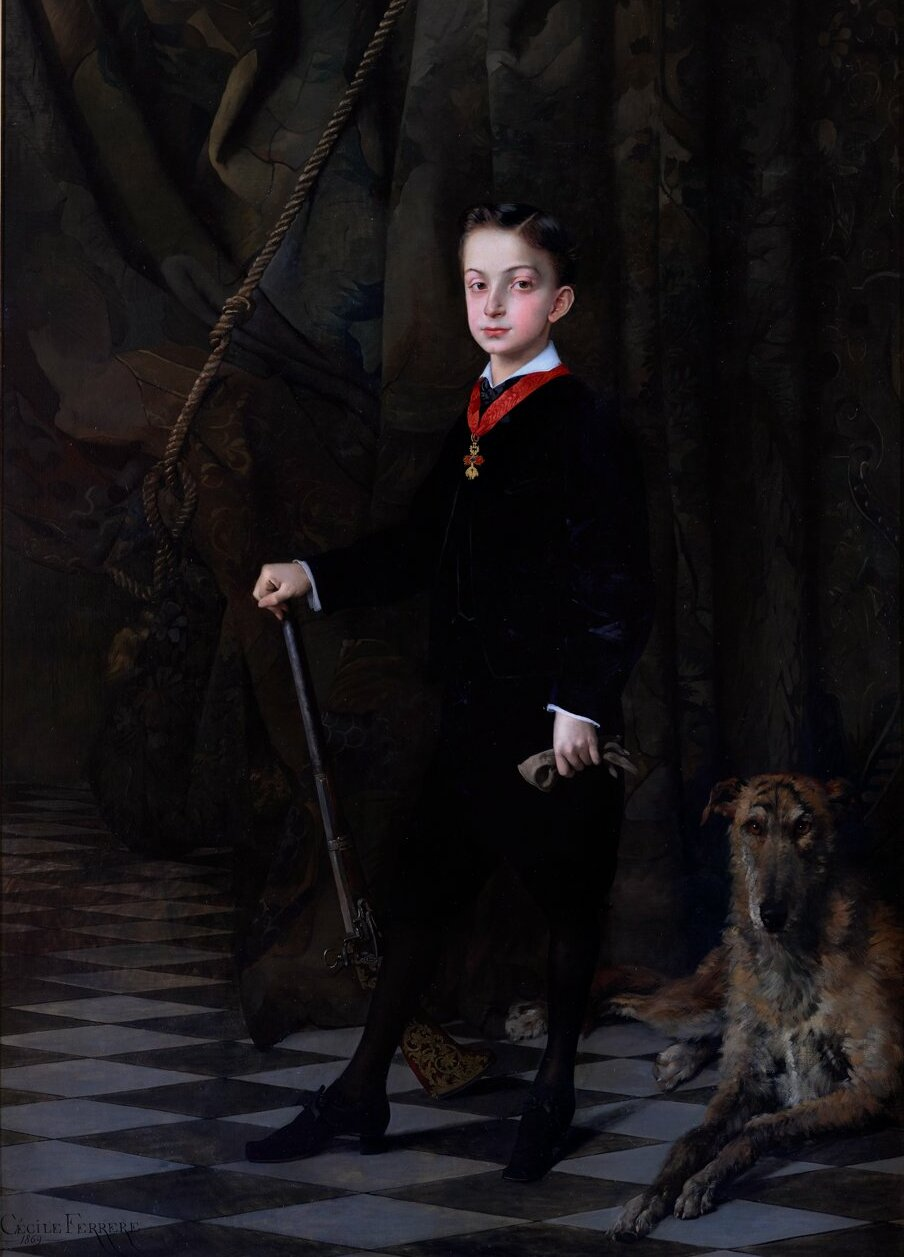
Portrait of a young Alfonso by Cécile Ferrère, 1869

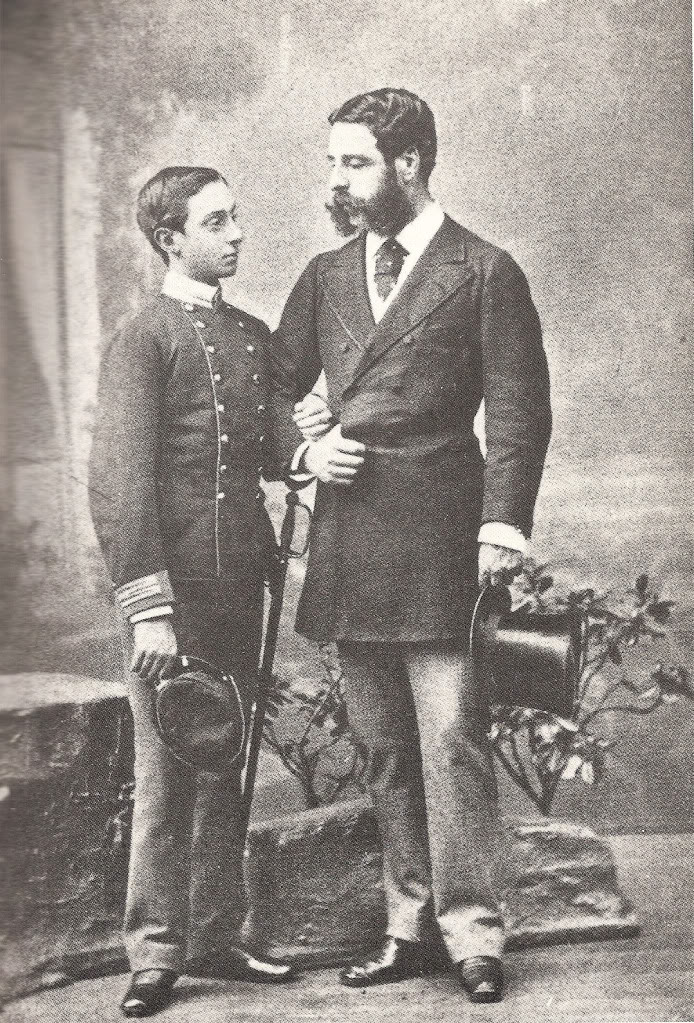
A young Alfonso with his mentor, the Duke of Sesto

After the revolution, the Cortes decided to set up a new dynasty on the throne. Prince Amadeo of Savoy, the younger son of King Victor Emmanuel II of Italy and a distant cousin of Alfonso by common descent from Charles III, was recognized as King of Spain in November 1870. During a tumultuous reign, Amadeo was targeted by assassination attempts and struggled with opposition from both Carlists and republicans while his own faction split. After the Carlists revolted and the Third Carlist War broke out, he abdicated and returned to Italy in early 1873.

Following Amadeo's abandonment, the First Spanish Republic was established, including the territories of Cuba, Puerto Rico and the Pacific Archipelagos. The first act of President Estanislao Figueras was to extend the abolition of slavery to Puerto Rico; Cuban slaves would have to wait until 1889. The republicans were not in agreement either, and they had to contend with a war in Cuba and Muslim uprisings in Spanish Morocco. In the midst of these crises, the Carlist War continued and the Carlist party made itself strong in areas with claims over their national and institutional specificity such as Catalonia and the Basque Country. This unrest led to the creation of a group in favour of the Bourbon Restoration, led by the moderate conservative Antonio Cánovas del Castillo.

Alfonso was well-educated and cultured, especially compared to his mother. His tutors took great care to have him educated in good schools and to familiarize him with different cultures, languages and government models throughout Europe. During the Franco-Prussian War, Alfonso relocated from Paris to Geneva with his family, and then continued his studies at the Theresianum in Vienna in 1872. Cánovas began to take responsibility for Alfonso's education with the goal of shaping him into the ideal king for the planned Bourbon Restoration, and next sent him to the Royal Military College, Sandhurst, in England. The training he received there was severe but more cosmopolitan than it would have been in Spain, given its atmosphere at the time.

On 1 December 1874, Alfonso issued the Sandhurst Manifesto, where he set the ideological basis of the Bourbon Restoration. It was drafted in reply to a birthday greeting from his followers, a manifesto proclaiming himself the sole representative of the Spanish monarchy. At the end of 1874, Brigadier Martínez Campos, who had long been working more or less openly for the king, led some battalions of the central army to Sagunto, rallied the troops sent against him to his own flag, and entered Valencia in the king's name. Thereupon the President resigned, and his power was transferred to the king's plenipotentiary and adviser, Cánovas, although Cánovas himself disapproved of the intervention of the military in politics.

== Reign ==
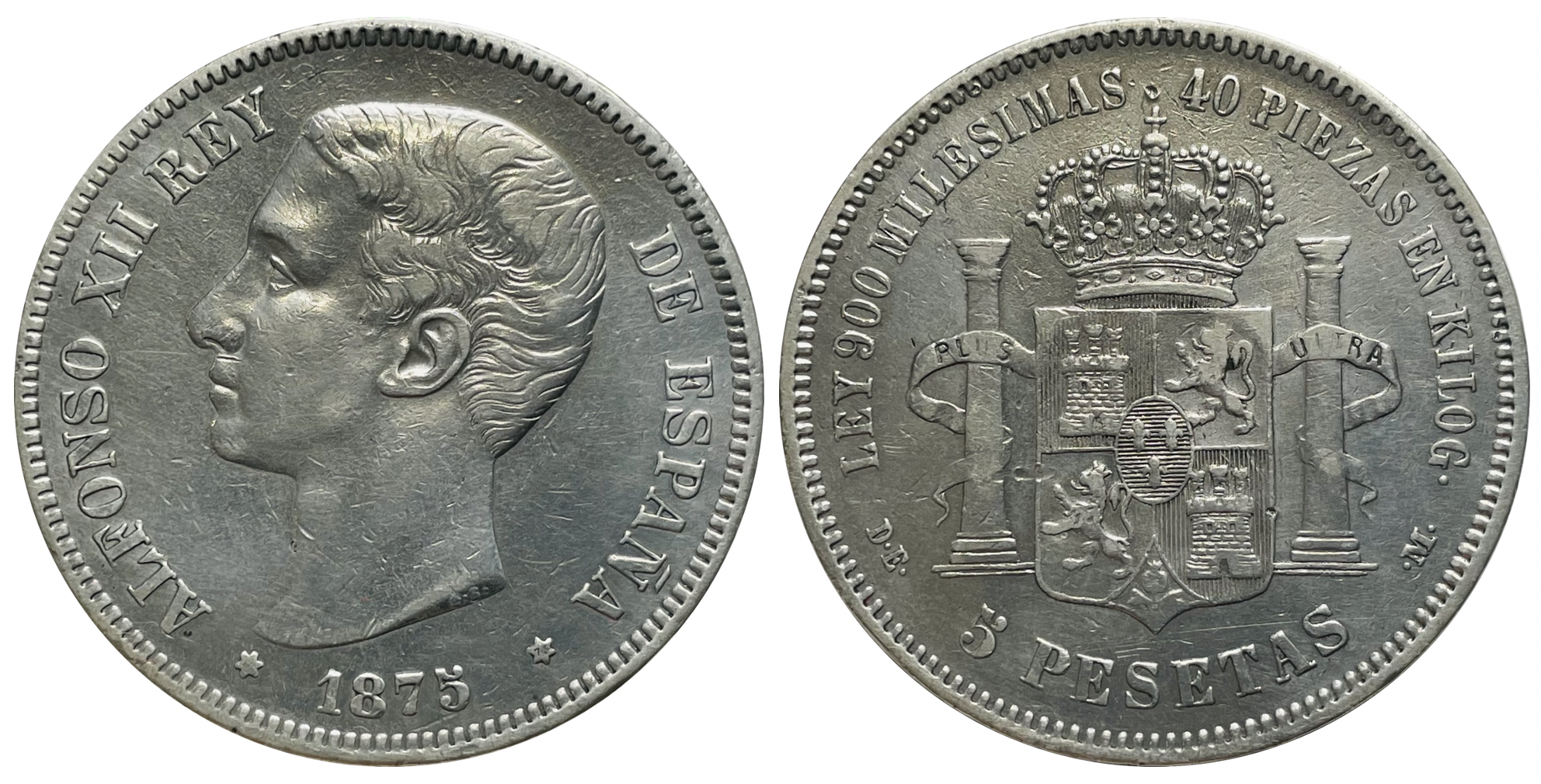
5 Peseta of Alfonso XII

Within a few days after Cánovas del Castillo took power as prime minister, the new king, proclaimed on 29 December 1874, arrived at Madrid, passing through Barcelona and Valencia and was acclaimed everywhere in 1875. In 1876, a vigorous campaign against the Carlists, in which the young king took part, resulted in the defeat of Don Carlos and the Duke's abandonment of the struggle.

Initially led by Cánovas del Castillo as moderate prime minister, what was thought at one time as a coup aimed at placing the military in the political-administrative positions of power, in reality ushered in a civilian regime that lasted until Primo de Rivera's 1923 coup d'état. Cánovas was the real architect of the new regime of the Restoration.

In 1881 Alfonso refused to sanction a law by which the ministers were to remain in office for a fixed term of 18 months. Upon the consequent resignation of Cánovas del Castillo, he summoned Práxedes Mateo Sagasta, the Liberal leader, to form a new cabinet.

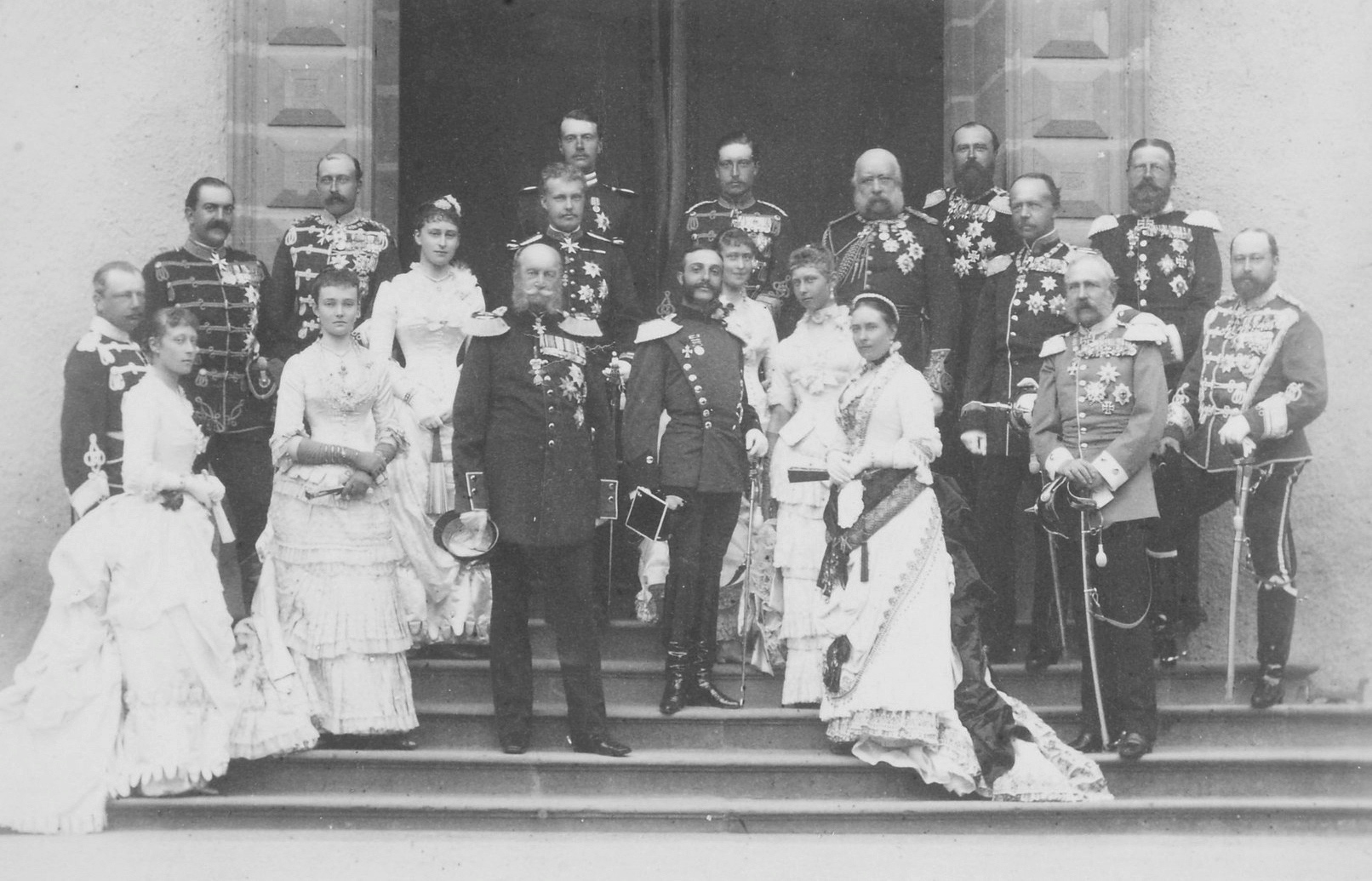
Alfonso surrounded by his relative European monarchs and their spouses at Homburg Castle in 1883. Milan I, Wilhelm I and Carlos I can be seen amongst others

In order to eliminate one of the problems of the reign of Isabel II, the single party and its destabilizing consequences, the Liberal Party was allowed to incorporate and participate in national politics, and the 'turnismo' or alternation was to become the new system. Turnismo would be endorsed in the Constitution of 1876 and the Pact of El Pardo (1885). It meant that liberal and conservative prime ministers would succeed each other ending thus the troubles.

This led to the end of the Carlist revolts and the victory over the New York-backed Cuban revolutionaries, and led to a huge backing both by insular and peninsular Spaniards of Alfonso.

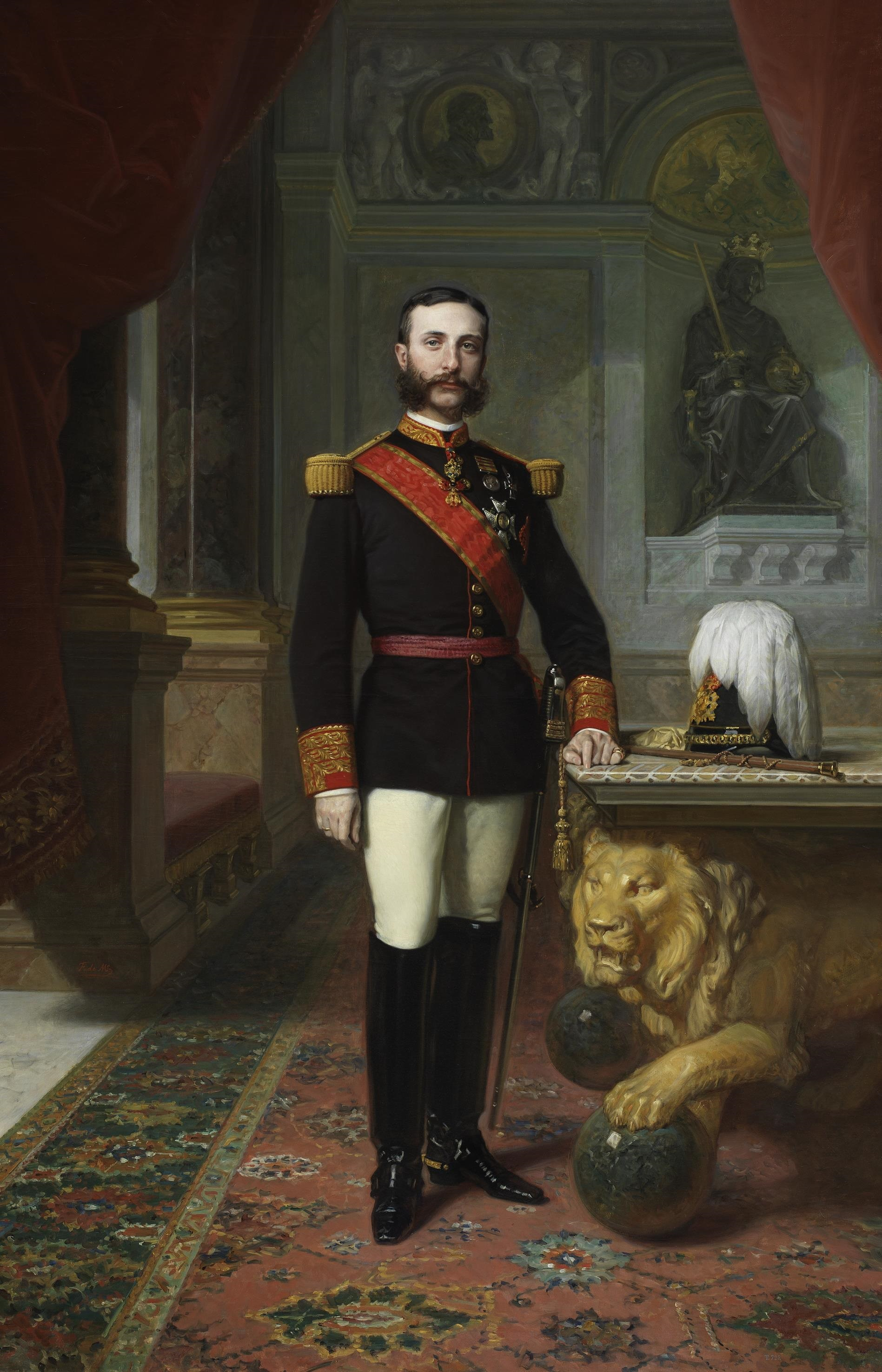
Portrait by Federico de Madrazo, 1886

Alfonso's short reign established the foundations for the final socioeconomic recuperation of Spain, bringing an end to the political instability that had dominated Spain for the past two-thirds of a century (see History of Spain (1808–1874)). Both Europe (the coastal regions, such as the Basque Country, Catalonia, and Asturias) and the colonies in the Antilles and Pacific were able to grow steadily. Cuba and Puerto Rico prospered to the point that Spain's first train was not in Spain proper but between Havana and Güines in Cuba, and the first telegraph in Latin America was in Puerto Rico, established by Samuel Morse, whose daughter and son-in-law lived there. Upon the American invasion of Puerto Rico, ten US dollars were needed to buy one Puerto Rican peso.

== Marriages ==
On 23 January 1878 at the Basilica of Atocha in Madrid, Alfonso married his first cousin, Princess María de las Mercedes, but she died of typhoid fever at only 18. Their marriage lasted only five months and three days.

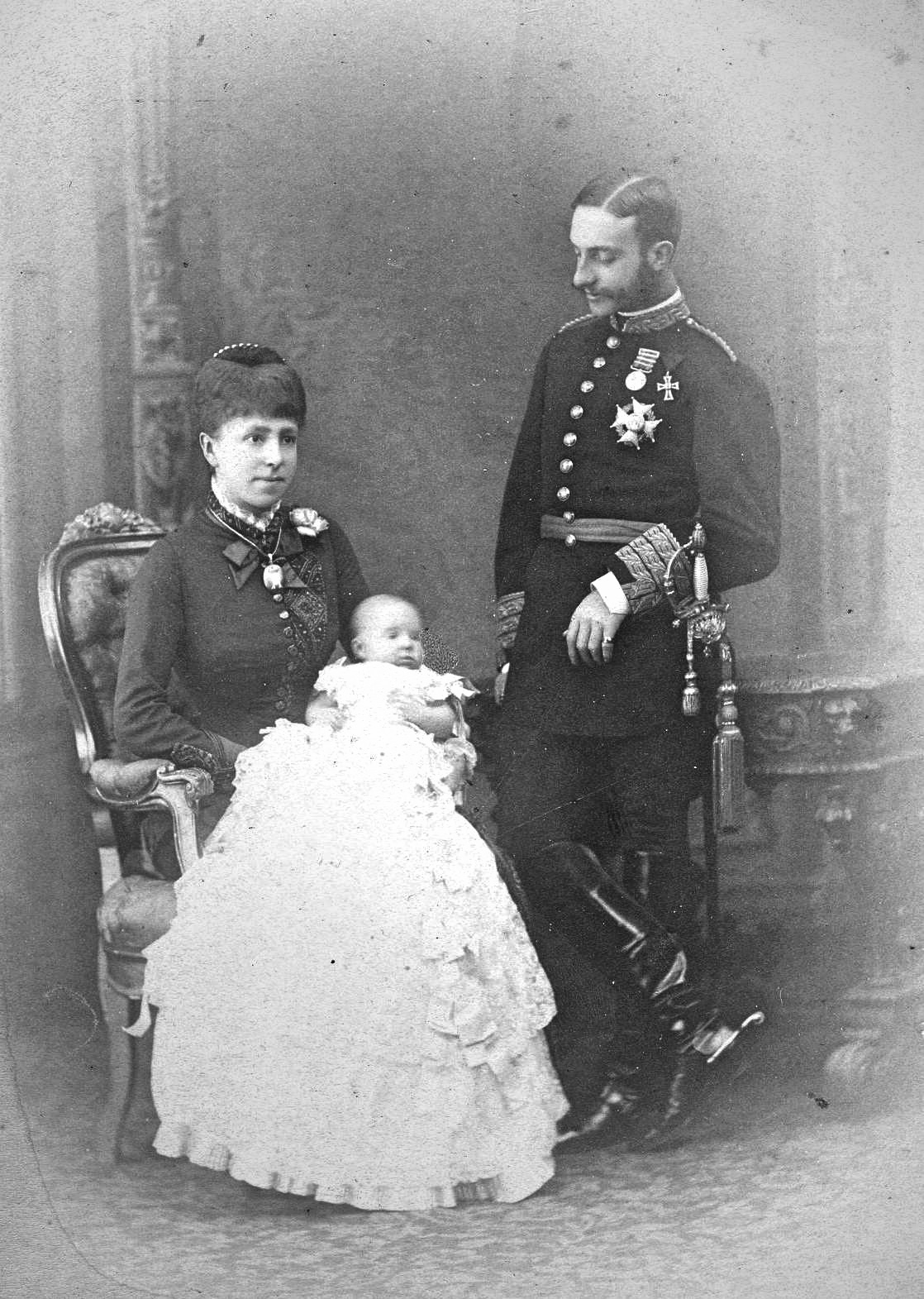
King Alfonso XII and Queen Maria Christina with their daughter Mercedes in 1880

On 29 November 1879 at the Basilica of Atocha in Madrid, Alfonso married his double third cousin, Archduchess Maria Christina of Austria. During the honeymoon, a pastry cook named Otero fired at the young sovereign and his wife as they were driving in Madrid.

The children of this marriage were:

- María de las Mercedes, Princess of Asturias (11 September 1880 – 17 October 1904), married on 14 February 1901 to Prince Carlos of Bourbon-Two Sicilies and had three children. She was titular heir to the throne of Spain from her father's death until her brother's posthumous birth.
- Infanta María Teresa (12 November 1882 – 23 September 1912), married to Prince Ferdinand of Bavaria on 12 January 1906 and had four children.
- Alfonso XIII (17 May 1886 – 28 February 1941). Born posthumously. Married Princess Victoria Eugenie of Battenberg and had seven children with her, along with five known illegitimate children.

Alfonso had two sons by Elena Armanda Nicolasa Sanz y Martínez de Arizala (15 December 1849 in Castellón de la Plana – 24 December 1898 in Paris):

- Alfonso Sanz y Martínez de Arizala (28 January 1880 in Madrid – 19 March 1970 in Paris), married in 1922 to María de Guadalupe de Limantour y Mariscal.
- Fernando Sanz y Martínez de Arizala (28 February 1881 in Madrid – 8 January 1925 in Pau, France), unmarried and without issue.

== Death and impact ==
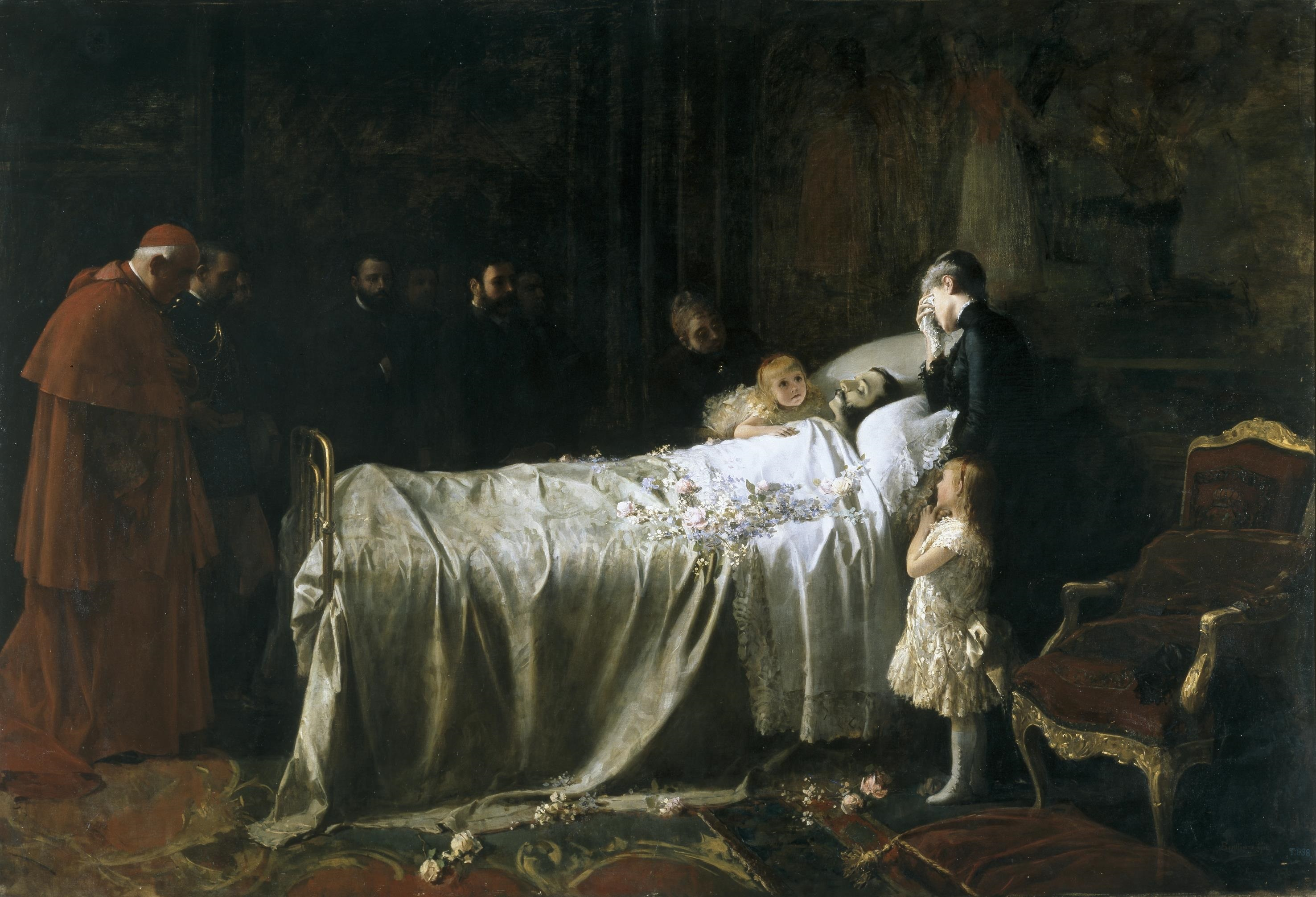
Death of Alfonso XII or The last kiss, by Juan Antonio Benlliure

In November 1885, Alfonso died aged 27 at the Royal Palace of El Pardo near Madrid. He had been suffering from tuberculosis, but the immediate cause of his death was a recurrence of dysentery.

In 1902, his widow Maria Cristina initiated a national contest to build a monument in memory of Alfonso. The winning design, by José Grases Riera, was constructed in an artificial lake in Madrid's Parque del Buen Retiro in 1922.

Coming to the throne at such an early age, Alfonso had served no apprenticeship in the art of ruling. Benevolent and sympathetic in disposition, he won the affection of his people by fearlessly visiting districts ravaged by cholera or devastated by the 1884 Andalusian earthquake. His capacity for dealing with men was considerable, and he never allowed himself to become the instrument of any particular party. During his short reign, peace was established both at home and abroad, finances were well regulated, and the various administrative services were placed on a basis that afterwards enabled Spain to pass through the disastrous war with the United States without the threat of a revolution.

== Honours ==
- Spain: Knight of the Golden Fleece, 1857
- Kingdom of Portugal: Grand Cross of the Tower and Sword, 1861
- French Empire: Grand Cross of the Legion of Honour, March 1863
- Kingdom of Bavaria: Knight of St. Hubert, 1865
- Monaco: Grand Cross of St. Charles, 7 September 1865
- Belgium: Grand Cordon of the Order of Leopold (civil), 20 February 1866
- Austria-Hungary: Grand Cross of St. Stephen, 1875
- Saxe-Weimar-Eisenach: Grand Cross of the White Falcon, 1875
- Kingdom of Prussia: Knight of the Black Eagle, 13 June 1875
- Sweden-Norway: Knight of the Seraphim, 23 October 1877
- Denmark: Knight of the Elephant, 8 January 1878
- Kingdom of Italy: Knight of the Annunciation, 4 February 1878
- Empire of Japan: Grand Cordon of the Order of the Chrysanthemum, 11 September 1879
- United Kingdom: Stranger Knight Companion of the Garter, 24 October 1881
- Kingdom of Saxony: Knight of the Rue Crown, 1883

== See also ==
- Monument to Alfonso XII
- Reign of Alfonso XII
- Regency of Maria Christina of Austria

== Explanatory notes ==
Alfonso XII House of Bourbon Cadet branch of the Capetian dynasty Born: 28 November 1857 Died: 25 November 1885
Regnal titles
Vacant First Spanish Republic Title last held by Amadeo I	King of Spain; 1874–1885	Vacant Title next held by Alfonso XIII
Spanish royalty
Preceded by Isabella	Prince of Asturias; 1857–1868	Vacant Glorious Revolution Title next held by Emanuele Filiberto
Titles in pretence
Preceded by Isabella II	— TITULAR — King of Spain; 1870-1874	Succeeded by Monarchy restored
