= José Grases Riera =

Spanish architect

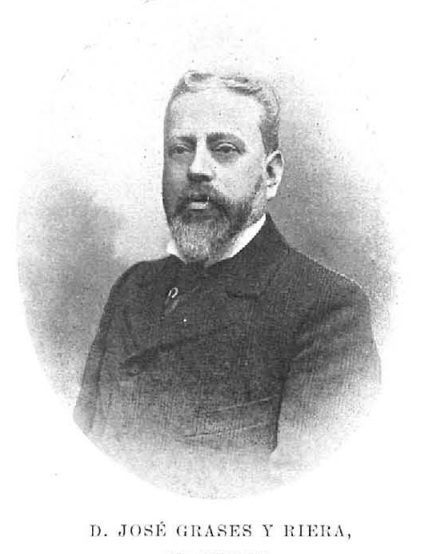
Portrait

José Grases Riera (25 April 1850 – 12 February 1919) was a Spanish architect from Barcelona.

Born in Barcelona, Grases graduated from the School of Architecture in Barcelona in 1878 and moved to Madrid shortly after. Through to the turn of the century he worked on residential projects, and proposed a realignment of the entire city, the Proyecto de Gran Vía Norte-Sur, which was not adapted but influenced the subsequent urban planning in the city.

In 1902 Grases won a national design competition for the Monument to Alfonso XII of Spain to be erected in the Buen Retiro Park. His design was a grand and elaborate curved colonnade, topped with a bronze equestrian statue of the king by sculptor Mariano Benlliure, and incorporating the work of 21 other artists. The monument was inaugurated on 3 July 1922, after Grases' death.

The architect also designed perhaps the most significant example of Art Nouveau in Madrid, the Palacio Longoria, built in 1903 for financier Javier González Longoria with a surface fabric seemingly sculpted out of cake frosting. (Many sources indicate Grases was influenced by Antoni Gaudí, but this stylistically dubious, and there's no clear evidence for it.)

Other work in Madrid includes the Palacio de la Equitativa, built for the insurance company from 1887 to 1891, with its ornate tower and sculpted elephant heads, and the 1901 monument to Antonio Cánovas del Castillo in the Plaza de la Marina Española, with sculptor Joaquín Bilbao.

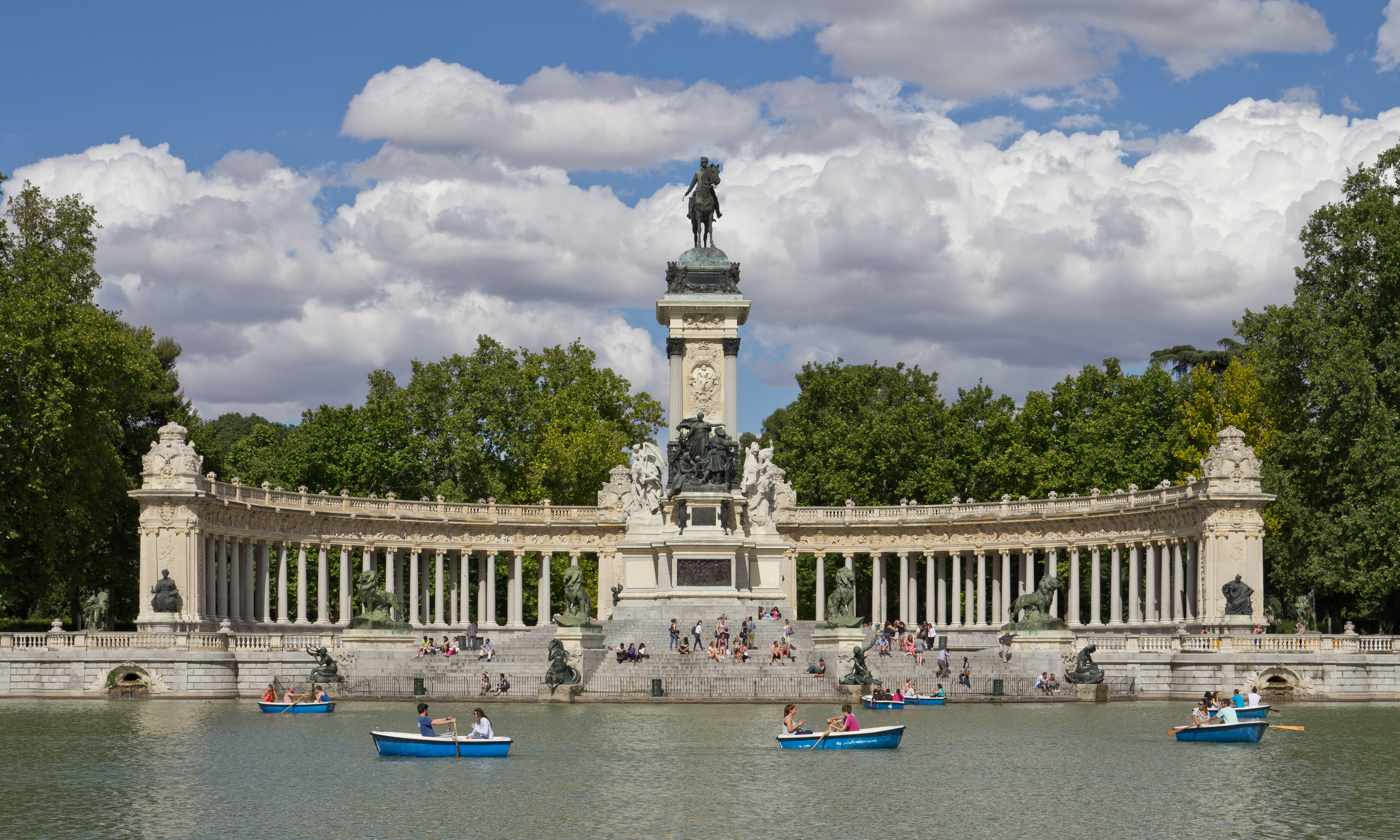
Monument to Alfonso XII of Spain, El Retiro, Madrid

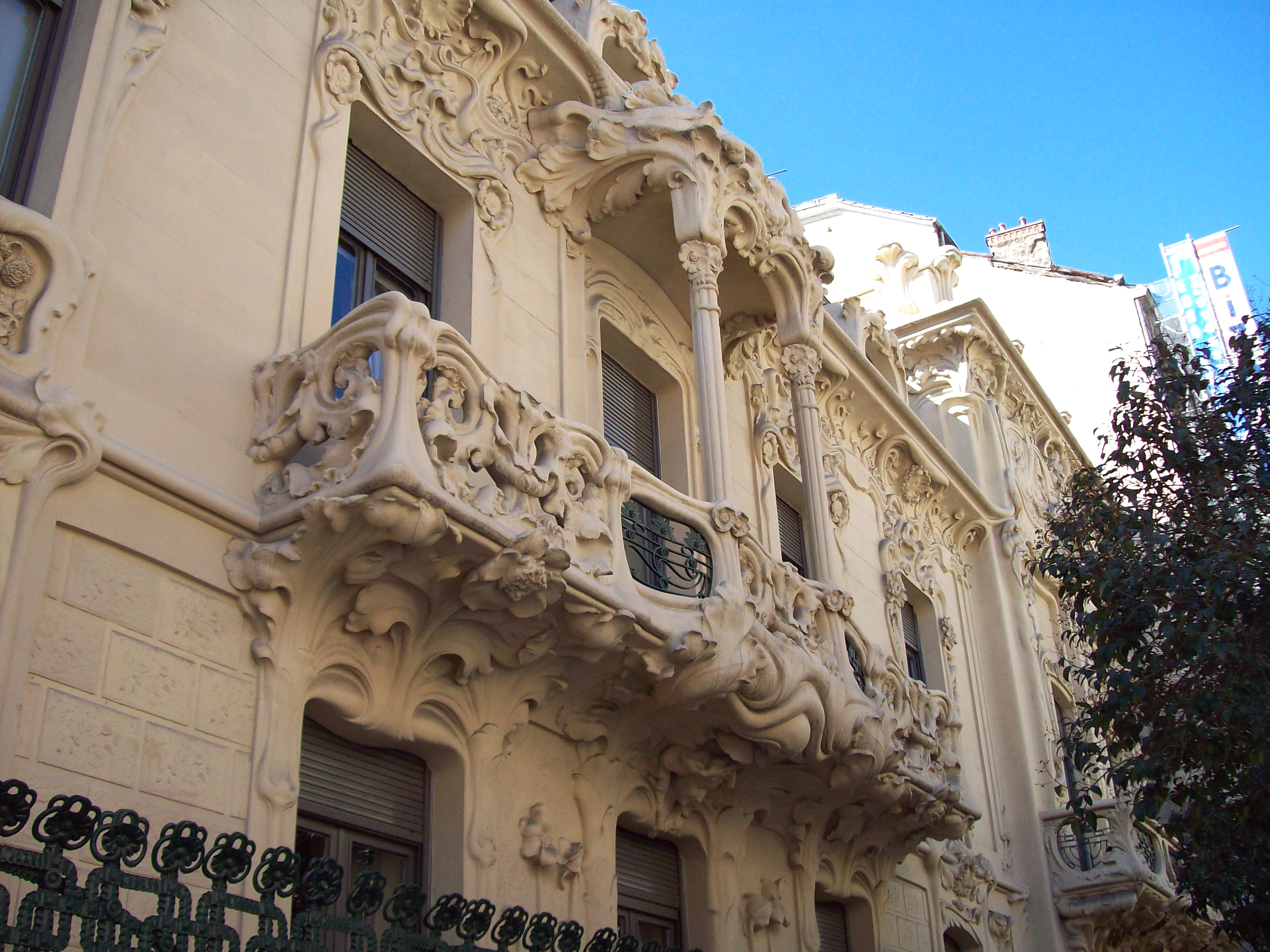
Palacio Longoria, 1903

== Sources ==
- on the Palacio de la Equitativa (in Spanish)
