= Royal Tobacco Factory =

Building in Seville, Spain

Coordinates: 37.3813°N 5.99047°W

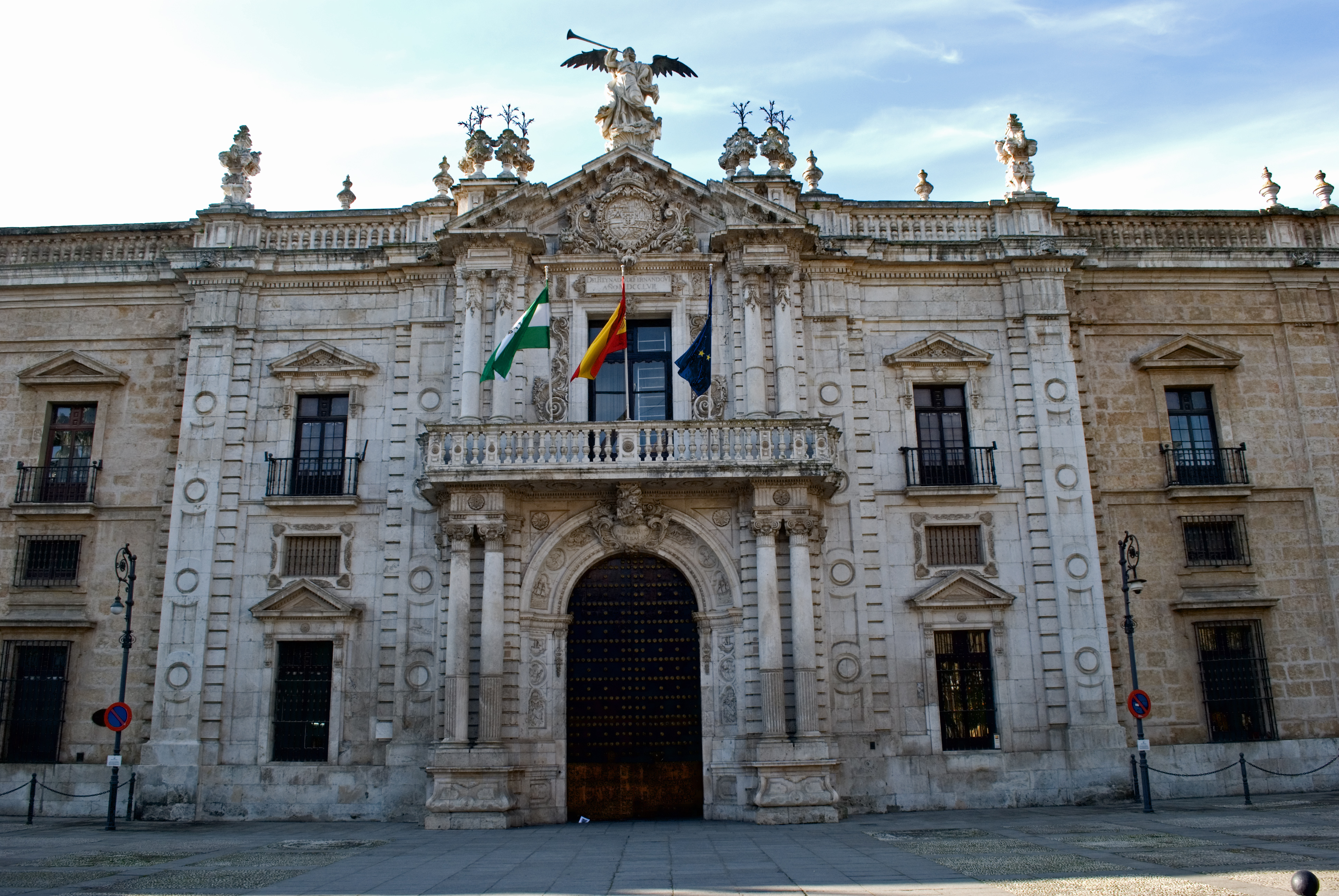
Main façade of the former Royal Tobacco Factory, now the seat of the rectorate of the University of Seville, seen from the San Fernando Street

The Royal Tobacco Factory (Spanish: Real Fábrica de Tabacos) is an 18th-century stone building in Seville, southern Spain. Since the 1950s it has been the seat of the rectorate of the University of Seville. Prior to that, it was, as its name indicates, a tobacco factory: the most prominent such institution in Europe, and a lineal descendant of Europe's first tobacco factory, which was located nearby. It is one of the most notable and splendid examples of industrial architecture from the era of Spain's Antiguo Régimen.

== Antecedents ==
The Spanish encountered the tobacco plant almost immediately upon their first arrival in the Americas in 1492. The city of Seville, home to the Casa de Contratación (The House of Trade), held a monopoly on commerce with the Americas. At the beginning of the 16th century the first tobacco manufacturers established themselves in Seville, the first anywhere in Europe. Initially, they were dispersed through the city, but were eventually concentrated in one place—facing the Church of Saint Peter—for sanitary reasons and to facilitate state control of the activity. This first dedicated factory, known as San Pedro, was housed in a former women's penitentiary and opened in 1620. It was then replaced by a new factory built in 1687. In the 18th century, the royal government decided to build the present big building you see today immediately outside the city walls.

== Construction ==
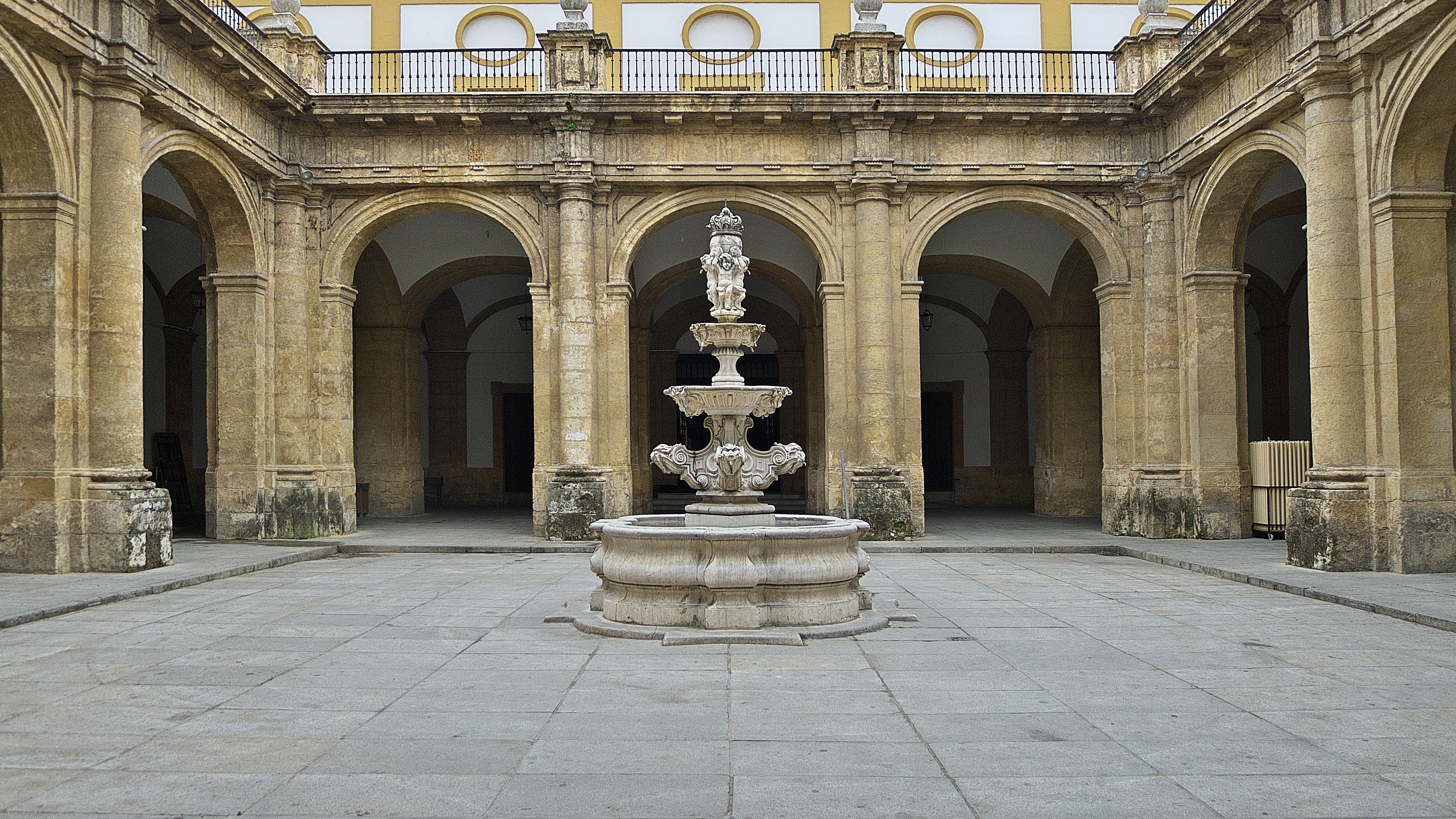
Main courtyard

This 18th-century industrial building was, at the time it was built the second largest building in Spain, second only to the royal residence El Escorial. It remains one of the largest and most architecturally distinguished industrial buildings ever built in that country, and one of the oldest such buildings to survive.

The factory was built just outside the Puerta de Jerez (a gate in the city walls), in the land known as de las calaveras ("of the skulls") because it had been the site of an Ancient Roman burial ground. Construction began in 1728, and proceeded by fits and starts over the next 30 years. The architects of the building were military engineers from Spain and the Low Countries, most notably:

- Ignacio Sala, who drew up the initial proposal in 1725. All of Ignacio Sala's plan that was executed was the building of a foundation and the canalization of the Tagarete, a stream that ran roughly along the route of the present-day Calle de San Fernando.
- Diego Bordick Deverez replaced Sala and was in charge of the project from 1731 to 1750. He developed a new plan to accommodate larger machinery than was originally contemplated. In actuality, construction proceeded only in two years of this period, from 1733 to 1735.
- The Flemish engineer Sebastián Van der Borcht was put in charge beginning in 1750, and can be considered the primary author of the factory as it was built. He collaborated with local architects and builders Vicente Catalán Bengochea, Pedro de Silva, and Lucas Cintora.

== Operation ==
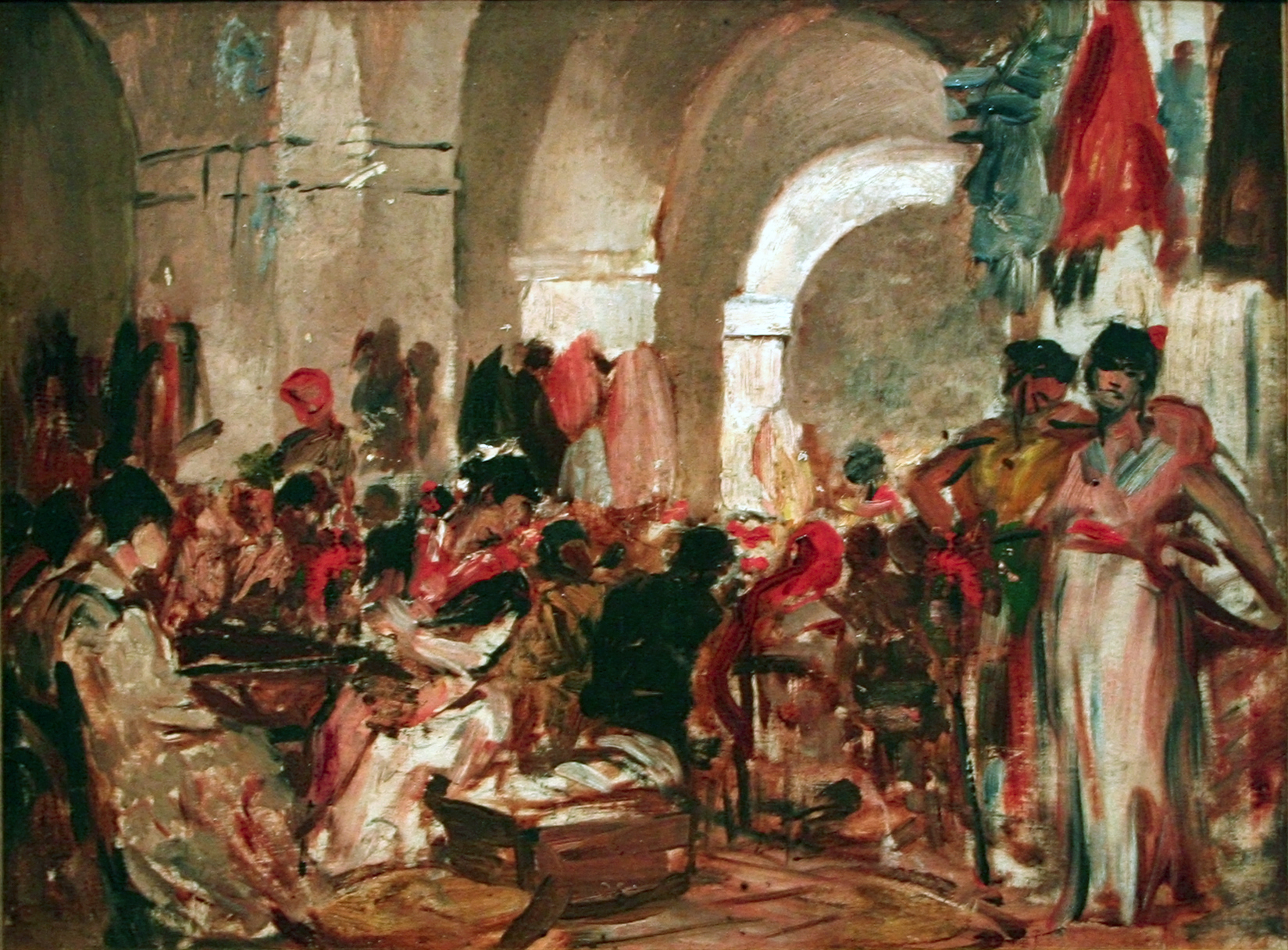
Cigarette workers in Seville by the Belgian artist Constantin Meunier

The factory began production in 1758; the first tobacco auctions there (which were the first in Spain) took place in 1763. At that point the factory was employing a thousand men, two hundred horses, and 170 "mills" (Spanish: molinos: the devices used to turn the tobacco into snuff, known in Spanish as polvo or rapé); tobacco came both from Virginia and from the Spanish colonies in the Americas. According to the inscription on two of the pillars of the drawbridge on the west side, the building was finished in 1770.

The production of snuff was heavy work: enormous sheaves of tobacco were hauled around manually, and horses turned the grinding mills. For centuries, Seville remained Spain's only manufacturer of snuff. The rising popularity of cigars resulted in part of the factory being adapted for that purpose; cigars were also made in several other Spanish cities: Cádiz, Alicante, La Coruña, and Madrid. Long after the manufacture of cigars elsewhere in Spain (and in Cuba) had become women's work, the workforce in Seville remained entirely male. By the beginning of the 19th century, 700 men were employed in the factory to make cigars, and another thousand to make snuff.

Over time, however, Seville's cigars developed a poor reputation. There were frequent problems with labor discipline, and quality was lower than in the factories where women made cigars; furthermore, men received better wages than women, so these inferior cigars were more expensive than those produced elsewhere. The factory became less profitable. Matters were brought to a head during the Peninsular War. The cigar-making portion of the factory closed in 1811. When it reopened in 1813, it was with a female workforce, then (from 1816) a larger, mixed workforce, and finally (after 1829) an entirely female workforce again, some 6,000 of them at the peak in the 1880s before numbers began to decrease because of mechanization.

Labor unrest was less common among the women than it had been among the men, though by no means was it unknown. There were revolts or strikes in 1838, 1842, and 1885, but none of them were sustained for more than a few days. With mechanization, the labor force reduced to 3,332 in 1906, about 2,000 in 1920, and by the 1940s only about 1,100. The title character of Bizet's opera Carmen is a cigarrera at the Royal Tobacco Factory.

In his autobiography, published in 1915, Hiram Maxim wrote of a visit he made to the factory:

There was an immense number of young women making cigars and cigarettes, but what attracted my attention most of all was the number of cradles and baskets with babies; about a third of the young women seemed to have a baby to take care of while they were working.

== University of Seville ==
In 1950 it was decided to move the tobacco operations to the Los Remedios neighborhood and to use the historic building as the headquarters of the University of Seville. The transformation of the building was a major undertaking, performed between 1954 and 1956 according to the plans of architects Alberto Balbontín de Orta, Delgado Roig, and Toro Buiza.

== Physical description ==
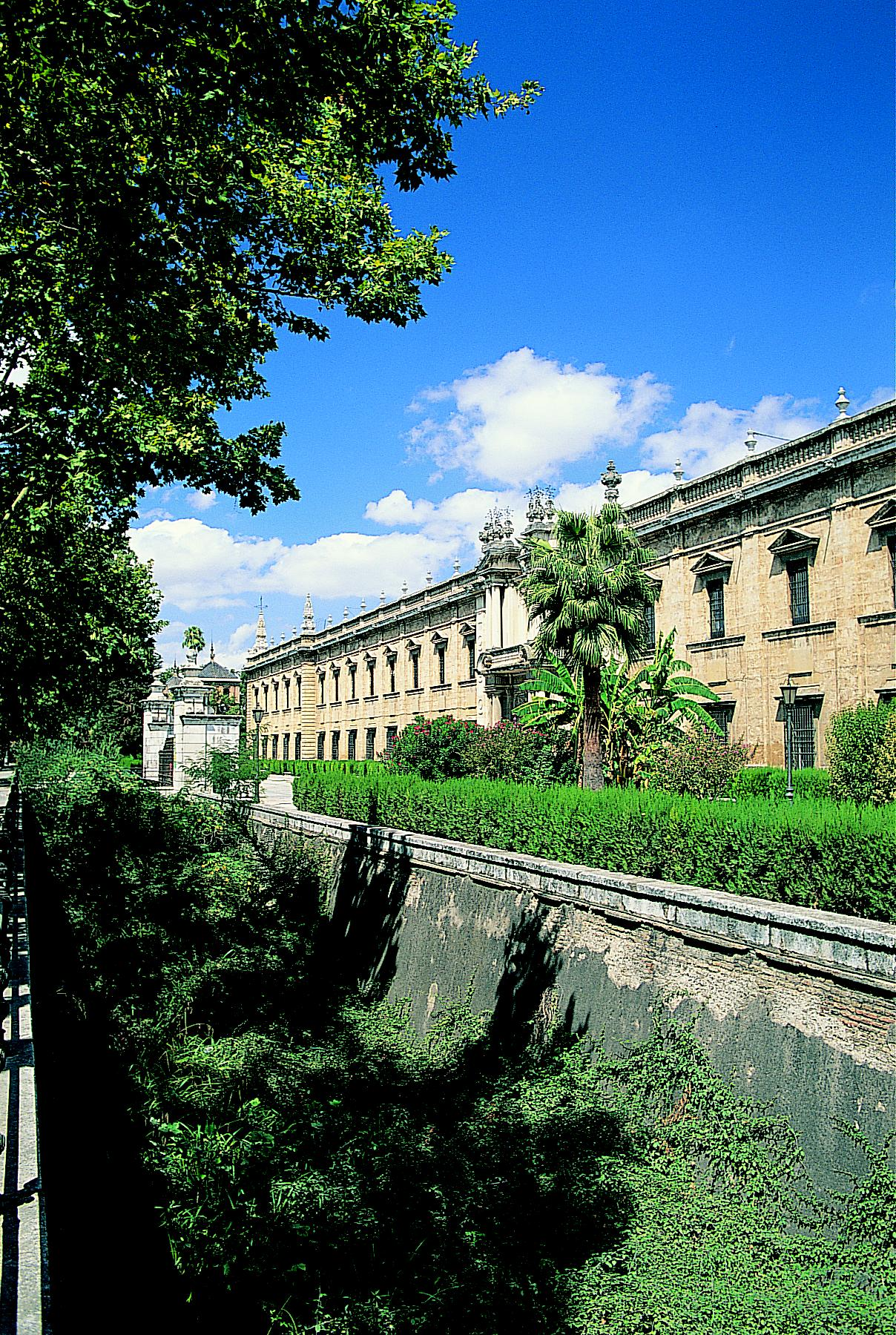
Lateral view of the building with the pit

Although the interior has been much altered, especially during the adaptation in the 1950s for use by the University of Seville, the Royal Tobacco Factory is a remarkable example of 18th-century industrial architecture. It is one of the largest and best industrial buildings in Spain, and one of the oldest buildings of its type in Europe. The building covers a roughly rectangular area of 185 by 147 metres (610 by 480 feet), with slight protrusions at the corners. The only building in Spain that covers a larger surface area is the monastery-palace of El Escorial, which is 207 by 162 metres (680 by 530 feet).

Renaissance architecture provides the main points of reference, with Herrerian influences in its floor plan, courtyards, and the details of the façades. There are also motifs reminiscent of architects Sebastiano Serlio and Palladio. The stone façades are modulated by pilasters on pedestals.

Plans originally called for building the walls pilasters, arches and other elements out of the yellow-brown limestone from Martelilla (near Jerez de la Frontera), but it proved too fragile and too often defective. In the end, the stone used for the building came from Morón de la Frontera.

There are paintings inside the Tobacco Factory recalling the women cigar makers who worked there. Outstanding among these is the painting by Gonzalo Bilbao, whose most well known depictions of customs and manners are in the Seville Museum of Fine Arts, including other portrayals of women cigar makers. A ditch was dug around the factory with several sentry boxes, indicating a defensive use. Today it is the headquarters of Seville University.

== The 1950s factory ==
The replacement factory built in the 1950s remained part of Spain's national tobacco monopoly Tabacalera until that was merged into Altadis in 1999. In 2004, Altadis announced plans to close the plant in 2007, bringing to an end Seville's long tradition of making tobacco products. The factory's last day of operation was 31 December 2007. In June 2009, plans were announced to turn over that facility, as well, to the University of Seville.
