= Eugenio Hermoso =

Spanish painter (1883–1963)

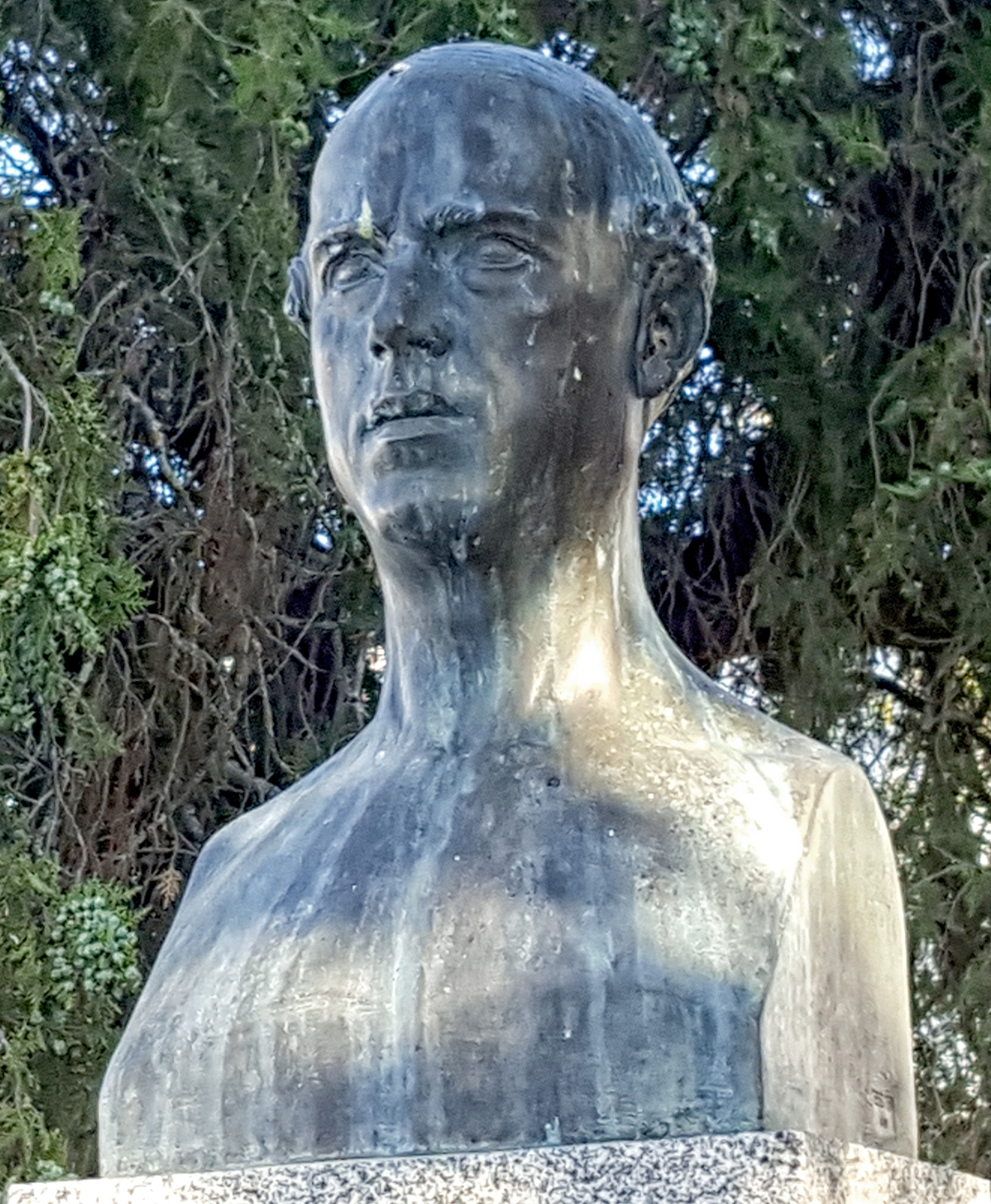
Eugenio Hermoso. Autorretrato c. 1930. 03.

Eugenio Hermoso Martínez (Fregenal de la Sierra, February 26, 1883 – Madrid, February 2, 1963) was a Spanish painter active in Badajoz. He was a professor of the Real Academia de Bellas Artes de San Fernando, and a contemporary of Benito Arias Montano and Juan Bravo Murillo.

Hermoso was a student of Gonzalo Bilbao and José Jiménez Aranda in Seville. He moved to Madrid in 1901. In 1904, he won the bronze medal at the National Exhibition of Fine Arts with La muchacha haciendo media, which was acquired by the Museum of Cádiz. His painting of "some rosy-pink peasant women carrying pumpkins and chickens and seen against the background of a setting sun" won much acclaim. He lived in the same place for several years with Daniel Vázquez Díaz. Together, they had attended classes taught by Jiménez Aranda in Triana, Seville. In 1905, he exhibited El Colegio e Hijas del terruño at the Exposición del Círculo de Bellas Artes which was praised by Francisco Alcantara and José Francés and also traveled to Paris and Brussels. In 1912, he exhibited at London.

In 1934, he exhibited in Argentina, Chile and Brazil. During the Spanish Civil War (1936–39), he befriended the painters Fernando Labrada and Francisco Prieto Santos.
