= Longoria Palace =

Palace of Longoria
- Palacio de Longoria (Spanish)
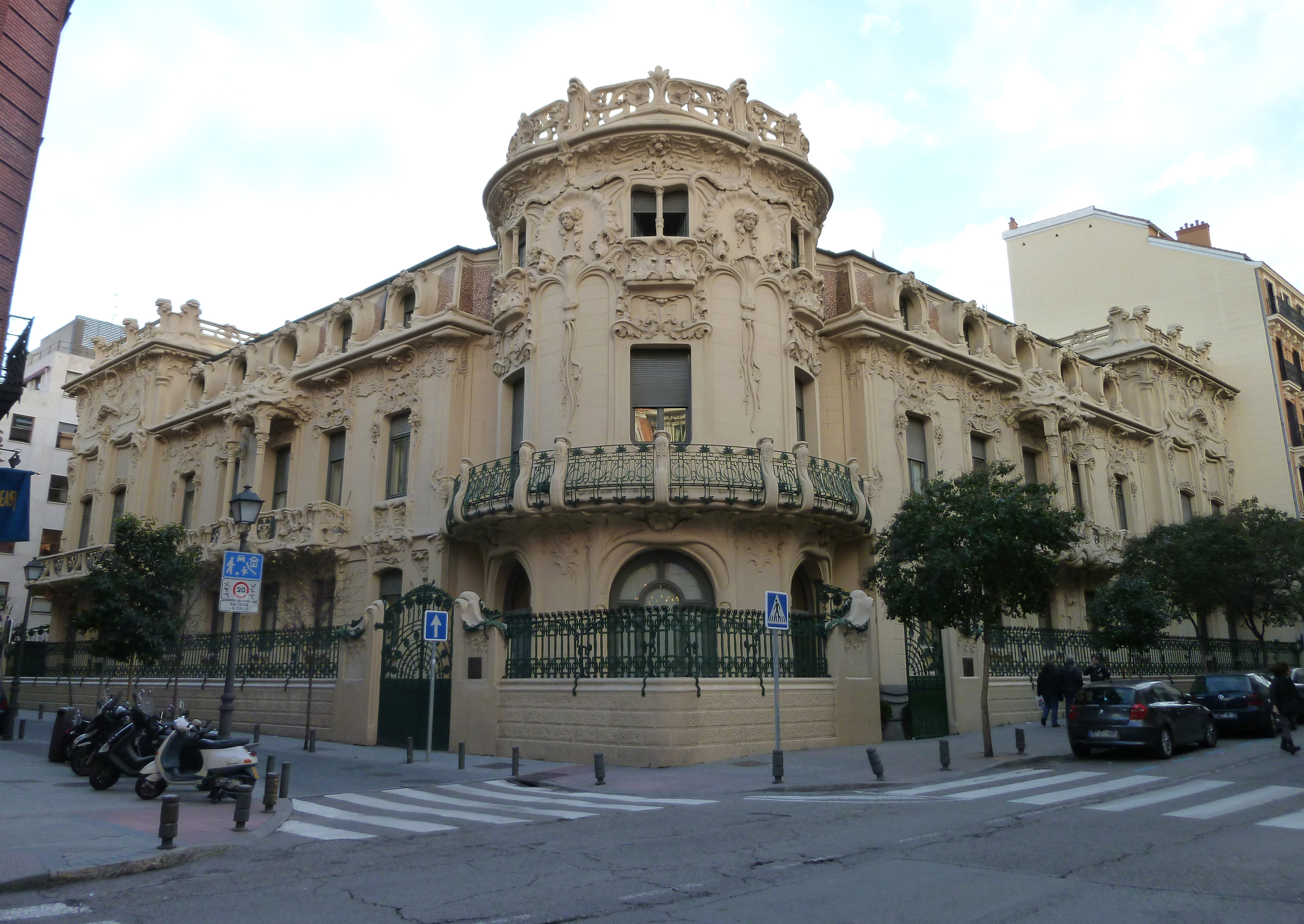

- Location within Spain
- 40.425395°N 3.69657°W
- Location: Madrid, Spain

History
- Built: 1902-1904

Site notes
- Architect: José Grases Riera

Spanish Cultural Heritage
- Official name: Palacio Longoria
- Type: Non-movable
- Criteria: Monument
- Designated: 1996
- Reference no.: RI-51-0009569

The Palace of Longoria (Spanish: Palacio de Longoria) is an Art Nouveau palace that the politician and financier Francisco Javier González Longoria ordered to be built in the district of Chueca, on Fernando VI street, in the city of Madrid, Spain. Together with the House of Gallardo (Spanish: Casa Gallardo) in the Plaza de España, it is Madrid's most notable example of modernist architecture.

Longoria contracted the Catalán architect José Grases Riera to design and build it in 1902. It was declared Bien de Interés Cultural in 1996 and is currently the headquarters of the Sociedad General de Autores y Editores (SGAE).

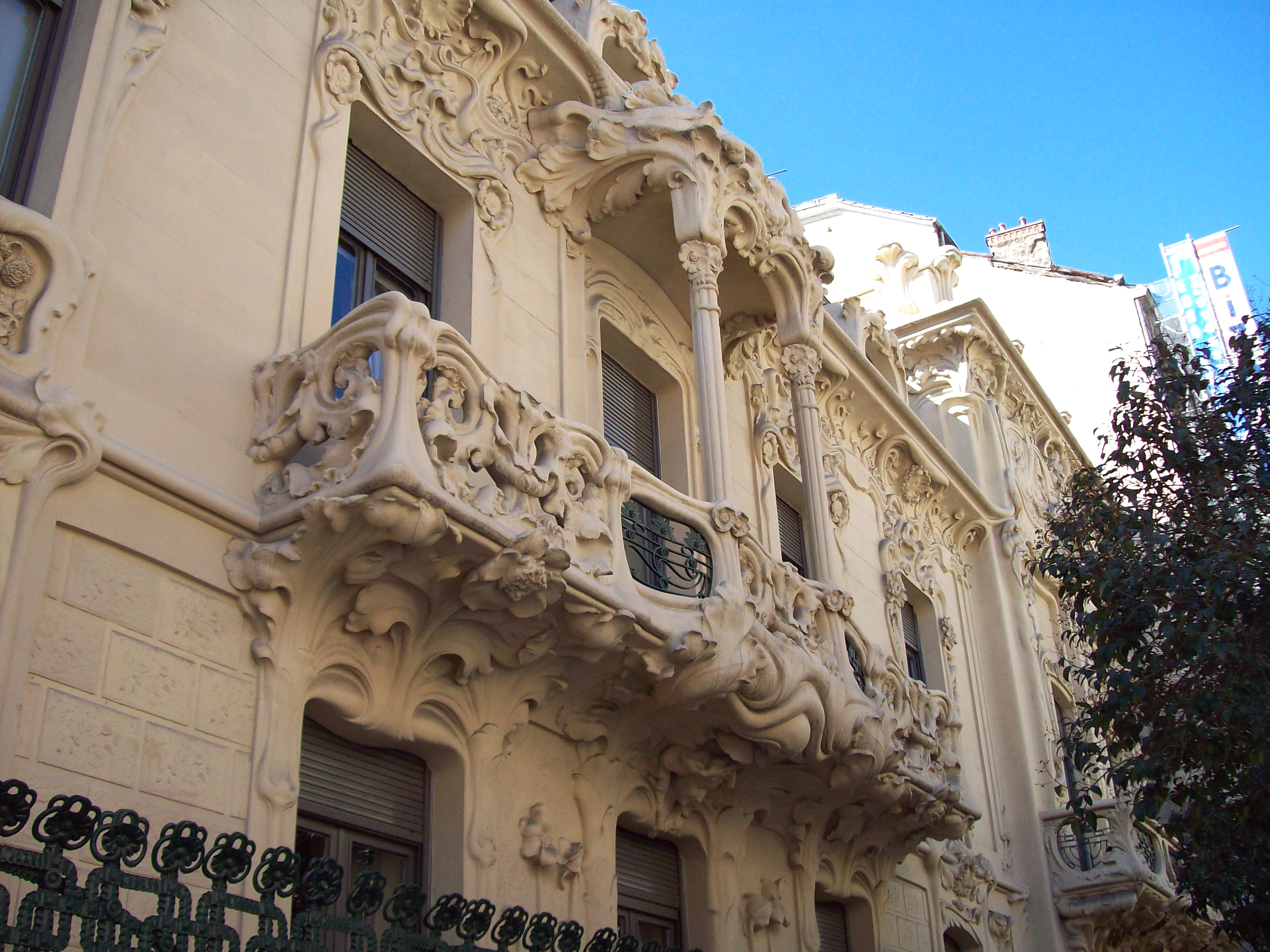
Detail: a palace balcony

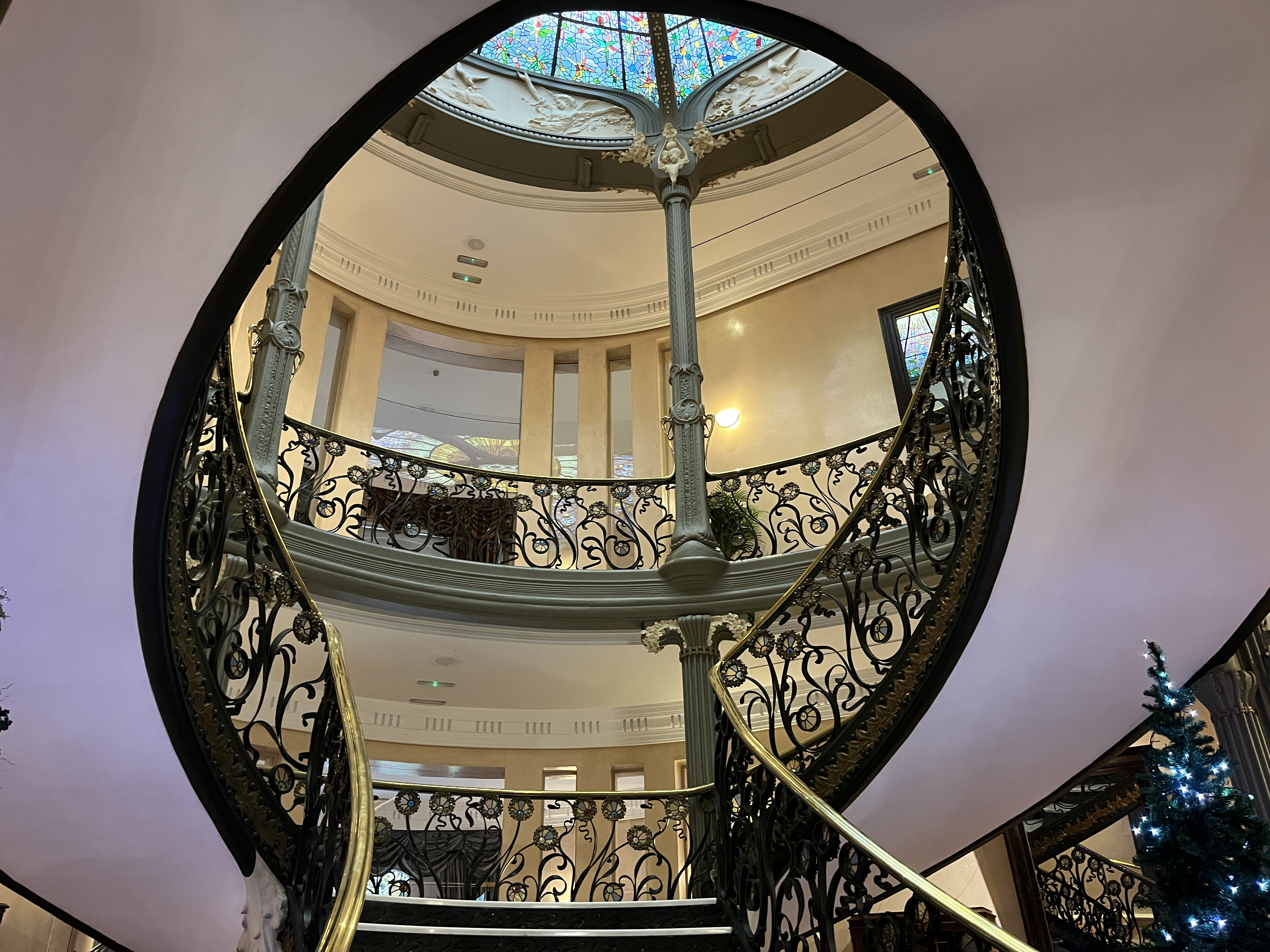
Central staircase. Longoria's Palace, Madrid
