= Gonzalo Bilbao =

Spanish painter

Gonzalo Bilbao Martínez
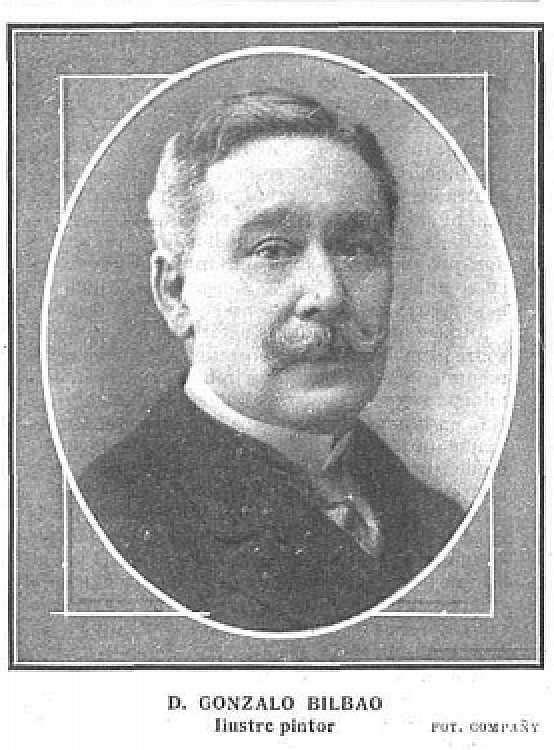
- Born: Gonzalo Bilbao y Martínez; 27 May 1860; Seville, Spain
- Died: 4 December 1938 (aged 78); Madrid, Spain
- Known for: Costumbrista and Orientalist subjects; art professor.

Gonzalo Bilbao Martínez (27 May 1860 – 4 December 1938) was a Spanish costumbrista painter and art professor.

== Biography ==
He was born in Seville, the son of a well-to-do lawyer and the older brother of the sculptor, Joaquín Bilbao. With the encouragement of José Jiménez Aranda, he began drawing lessons at an early age. At his father's insistence, he studied law along with his art lessons.

In 1880, he completed his law degree, but never entered into practice; continuing his art lessons and devoting himself exclusively to painting. As it turned out, his father was pleased with the results and paid his expenses for travelling to France and Italy with Aranda. He remained in Italy for three years, establishing himself in Rome; travelling frequently to Naples and Venice, where he painted both urban and rural scenes.

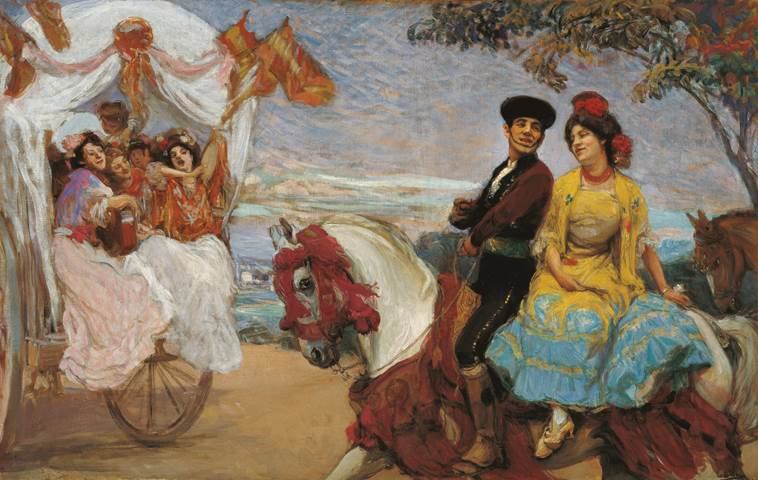
Romería (Pilgrimage)

He returned to Spain in 1884. His restless temperament made it difficult for him to become accustomed to life in Seville, so he moved constantly, painting landscapes and wasted little time planning new trips; visiting Algeria and Morocco. From there, it was back to Paris, where he sold his Moroccan paintings. His travels continued throughout Europe and America.

In 1893, he was appointed a member of the Academia de Bellas Artes and, in 1901, became President of the Athenaeum. In 1903, he succeeded Aranda as a Professor at the Real Academia de Bellas Artes de Santa Isabel de Hungría, where his students included Daniel Vázquez Díaz and Eugenio Hermoso. In 1904, he married the daughter of a French banker.

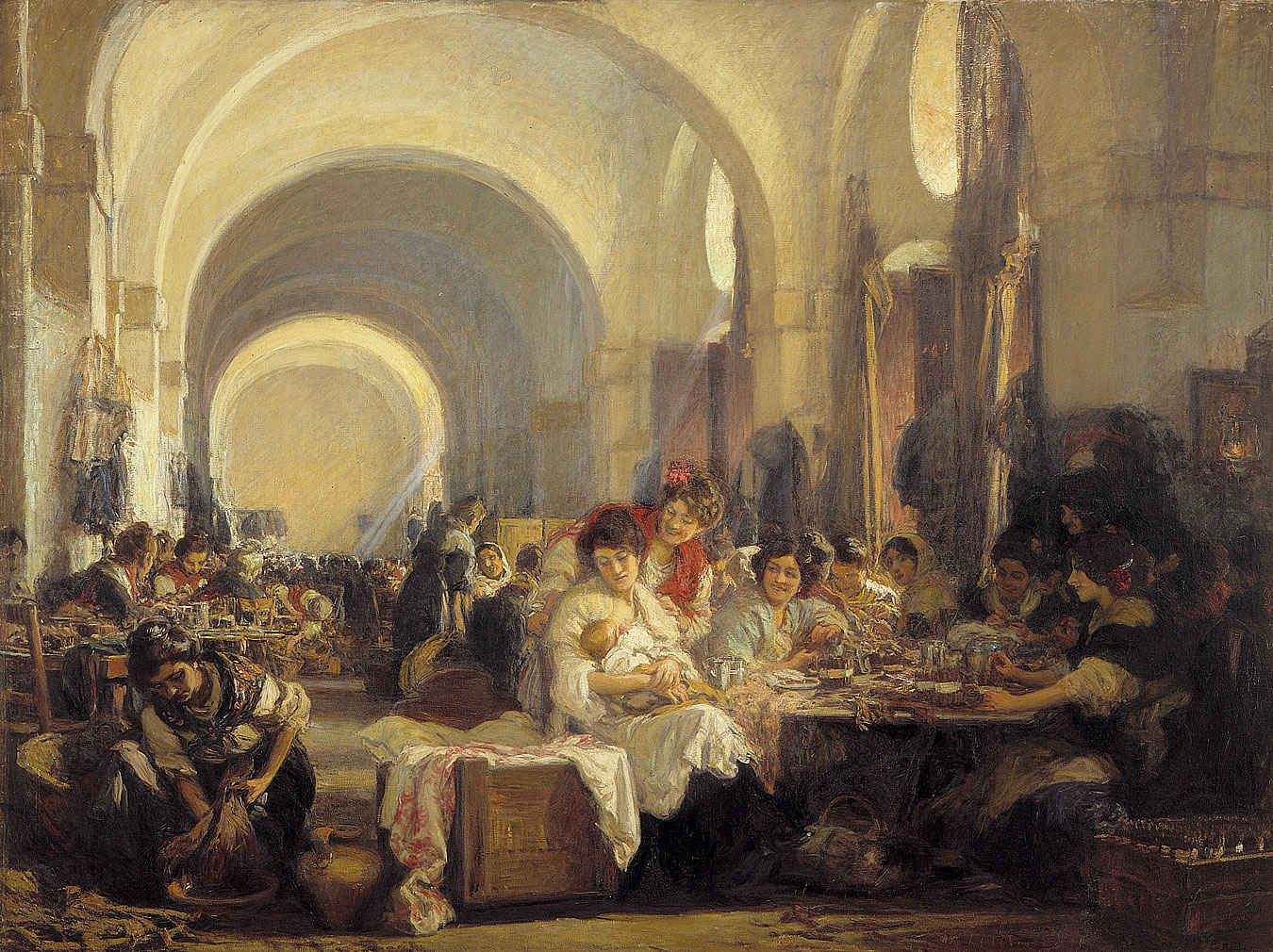
Las Cigarreras (The Cigar Makers)

He is perhaps best known for a series of sketches and paintings depicting "cigarreras" (cigar makers), made during the 1910s at the Royal Tobacco Factory. During his later years, he received numerous awards, including the Order of Isabella the Catholic and the Order of Carlos III.

In 1935, he was elected a member of the Real Academia de Bellas Artes de San Fernando and moved to Madrid. He died in Madrid, aged 78, during the Spanish Civil War, while the city was under siege. After the war, his widow donated his remaining works to the Museo de Bellas Artes.
