= José Alcoverro =

Spanish sculptor (1835–1908)

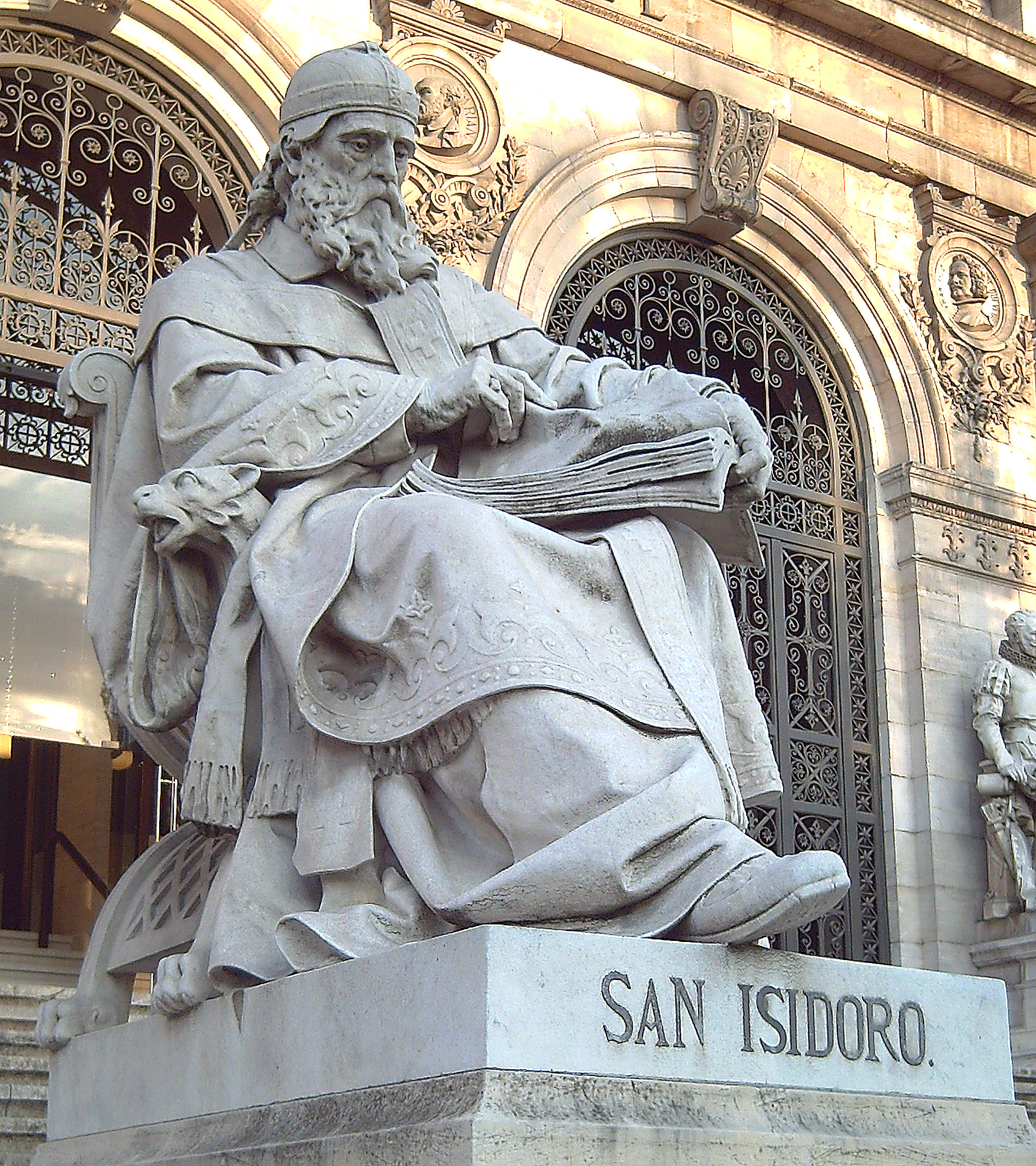
Isidore of Seville, 1892

José Alcoverro y Amorós (1835 — December 9, 1908) was a Spanish sculptor, a pupil of José Piquer.

He was born in Tivenys, Catalonia. Alcoverro was a virtuoso modeller who specialised in realistic portraiture, and whose penchant for realism animated both his religious compositions, often selected for their inherent drama, such as the Ishmael Fainting of Thirst (1867), which brought him to public attention) and his allegorical official commissions. He exhibited in the Madrid annual expositions from 1867 to 1907.

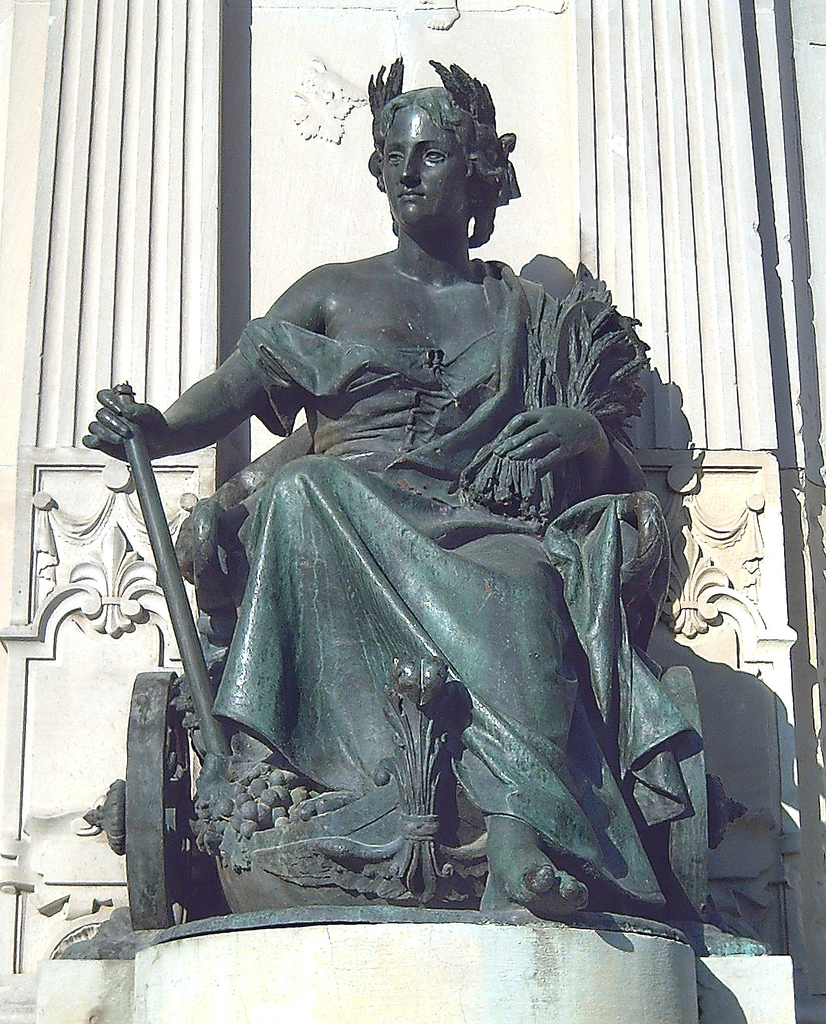
Agriculture in the Monument to Alfonso XII, 1907

Among his works in Madrid are:

- the figures of Alonso Berruguete, Alfonso X the Wise and Isidore of Seville at the Biblioteca Nacional de España, 1892
- a monument to Agustín Argüelles, 1902
- figures of Economy and Bookkeeping on the façade of the Banco Central Hispano, 1904
- allegorical figure of Agriculture, on the monument to Alfonso XII, in the Parque del Buen Retiro, 1907)
- the monument to Padre Francisco Piquer, Monte de Piedad

He died in Madrid.
