= School of Arts and Crafts of Toledo =

Coordinates: 39.8574°N 4.0312°W

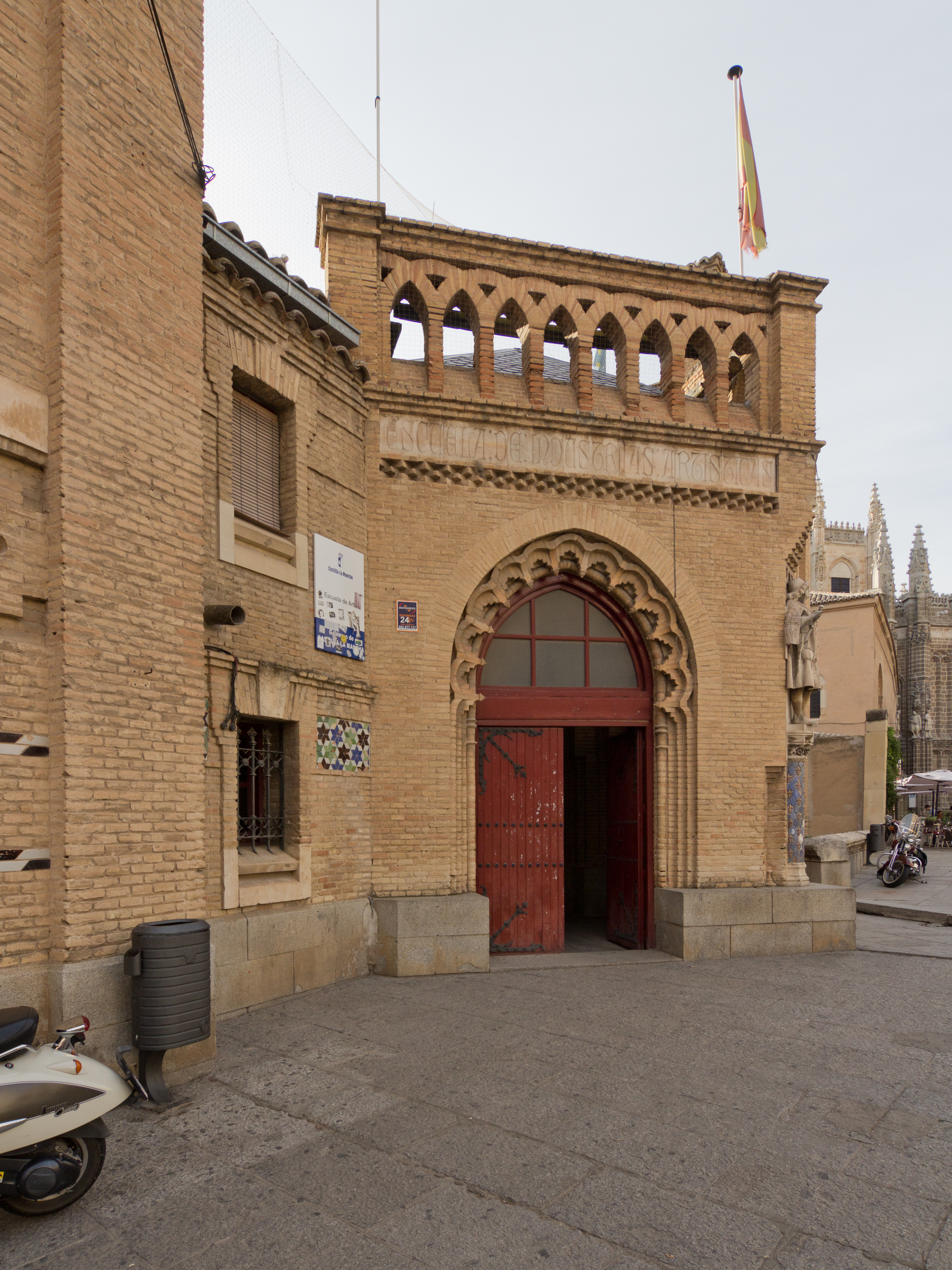
Access from calle Reyes Católicos.

The School of Arts and Crafts of Toledo (Spain) was built in the 19th century (around 1881) for the training of artists and craftsmen in the city of Toledo, constructed by Arturo Mélida y Alinari. The school was built around the same time as his restoration of the San Juan de los Reyes convent.

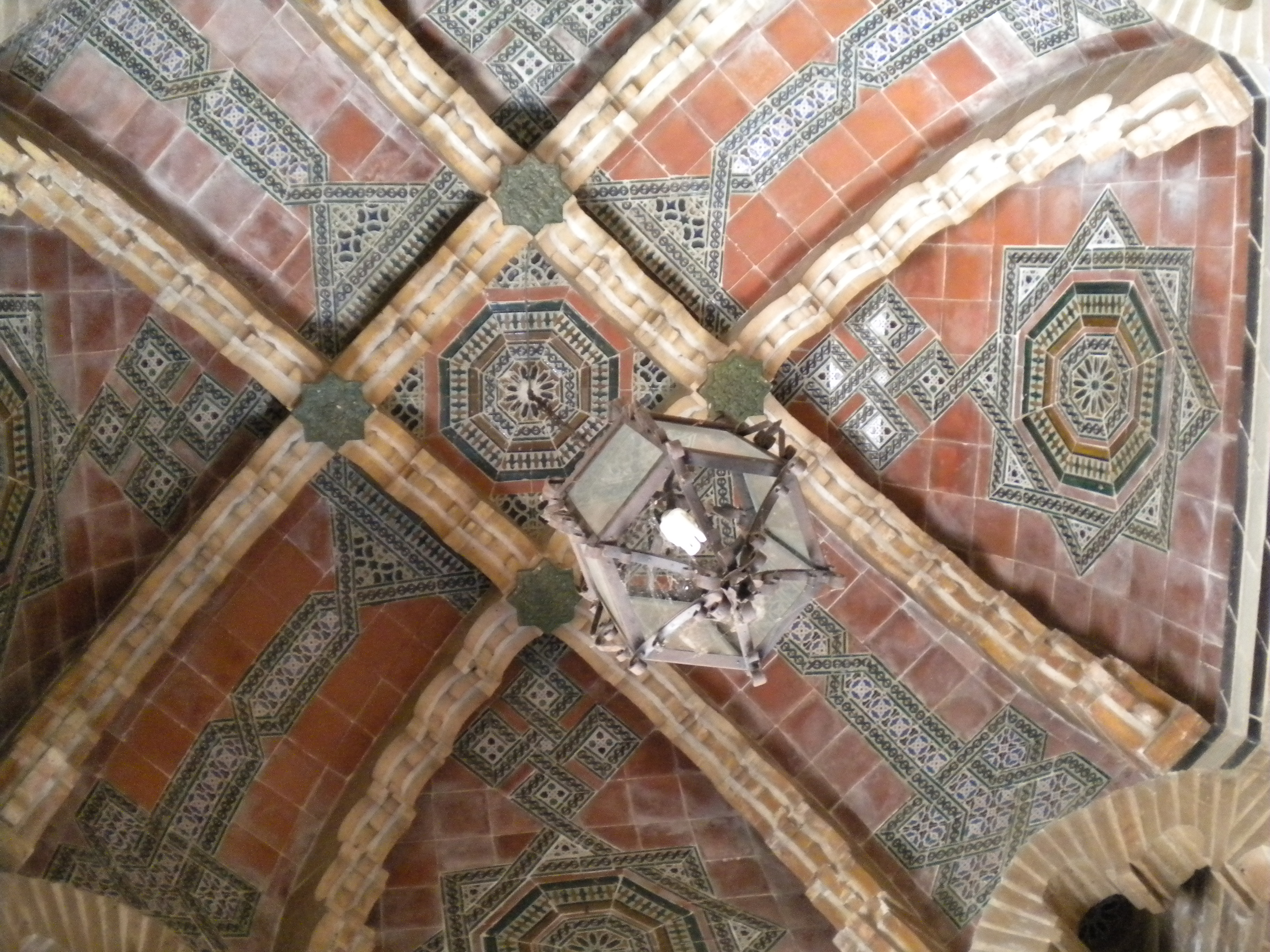
The ceiling

The school's architecture had influences from the nationalist sentiments in Europe in the 19th century. The impact of this sentiment to art and architecture can be seen in Mélida's work where he demonstrates his style of "gothic hispanoflaminco" considered at the time a national style.
