= Joaquín Bilbao =

Spanish sculptor

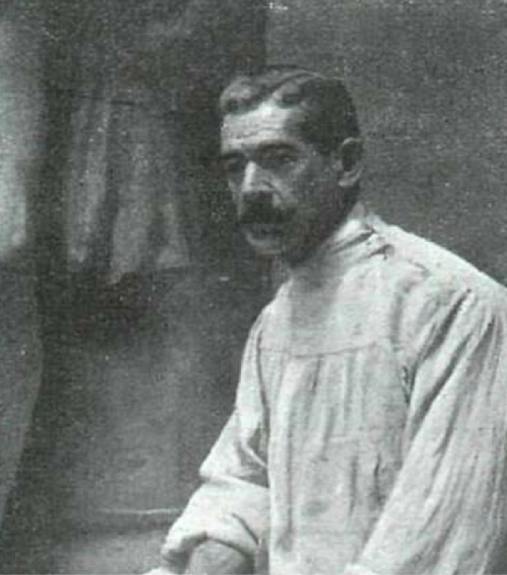
- Born: Joaquín Bilbao Martínez; August 27, 1864
- Died: January 30, 1934 (aged 69); Sevilla, Spain
- Education: University of Seville, Sevilla; Académie des Beaux-Arts, Paris
- Known for: Drawing and Sculpture
- Notable work: Monument of Ferdinand III of Castile in Seville (1924); Altarpiece of Christ of Maracaibo of Seville Cathedral (1913); Funeral statue of Cardinal Marcelo Spínola (1912)

Joaquín Bilbao Martínez (August 27, 1864 – January 30, 1934) was a Spanish sculptor. The equestrian statue of Ferdinand III of Castile in the Plaza Nueva, Seville, opposite the Town Hall, was sculpted by him.

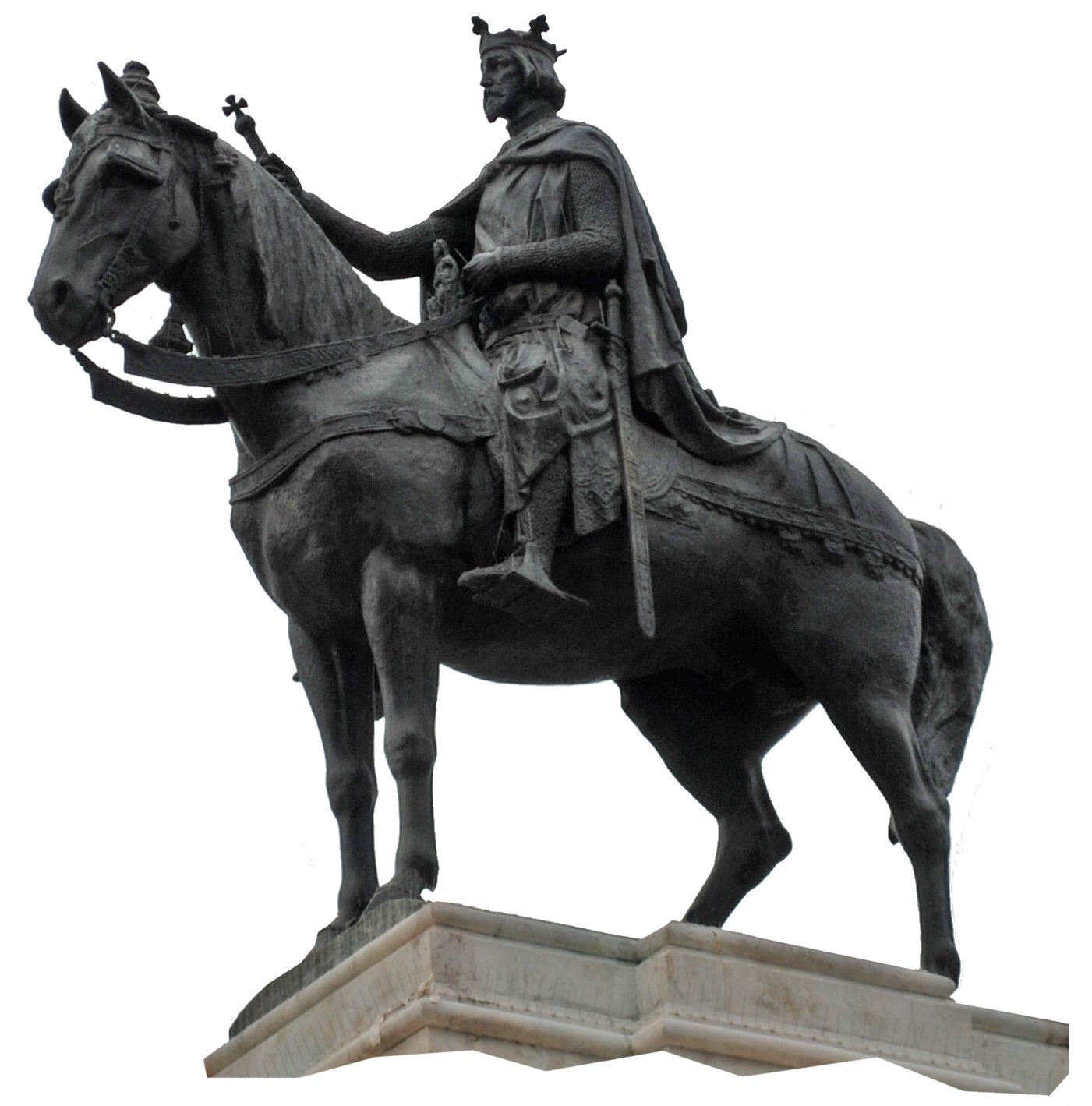
Statue of king Ferdinand III of Castile in Plaza Nueva, Seville

== Early life ==
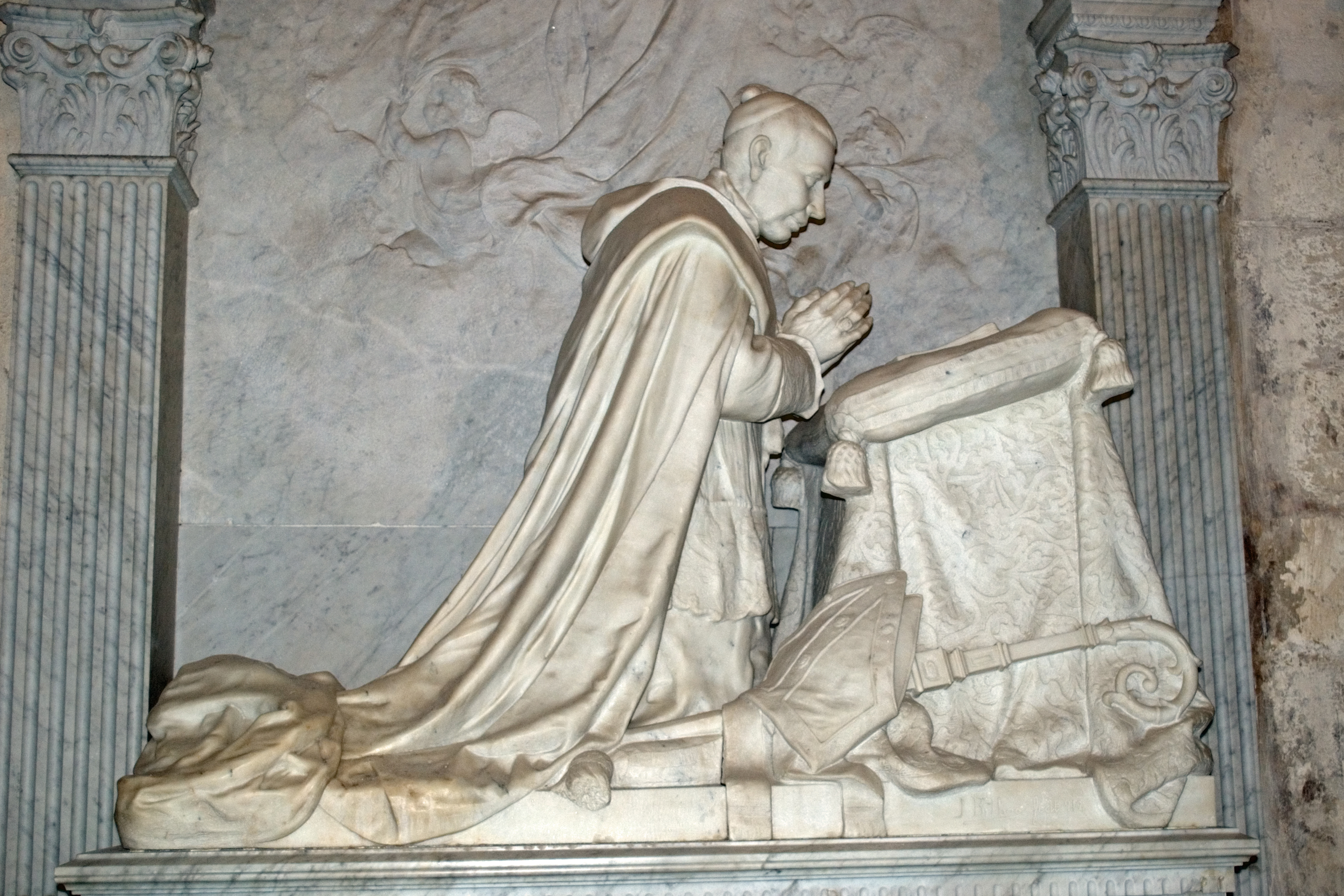
Funeral statue of Cardinal Marcelo Spínola, Chapel of Sorrows in Seville Cathedral

Joaquín Bilbao was born on August 27, 1864, in Sevilla. He was the brother of the painter Gonzalo Bilbao.

Bilbao began his studies at the Colegio San Alberto Magno. He studied Baccalaureate at the Provincial Institute. During his high school education, he enrolled with his brother Gonzalo in drawing and watercolor classes under Professor Pedro Vega. In 1881, upon finishing the Baccalaureate, he enrolled in the Faculty of Law of the old Literary University of Seville. He finished his law studies in 1887. In 1890, he started working at the law firm of Manuel de Bedmar y Escudero. At the age of 29 he left the legal profession to devote himself to sculpture.

== Career ==
In 1900 Bilbao moved to Paris, where he attended his Académie des Beaux-Arts for four years. During that time, he also made trips to Belgium, Netherlands, Germany, and England. During his stay abroad, he did not lose contact with the Academia de Bellas Artes in Seville and with the Spanish national exhibitions. In Netherlands and Belgium, he learned from the work of Constantin Meunier. He returned to Seville in 1904. In October of that year, the Academia de Bellas Artes named Bilbao as a member of Sculpture of the Provincial Commission of Historical and Artistic Monuments.

In 1909 he moved to Toledo and became professor at the School of Arts and Crafts of Toledo. In this city he was also conservator of the Casa Museo del Greco. In 1902 he was appointed Ordinary Commander of the Civil Order of Alfonso XII. In 1912 he returned to his hometown, where he remained, except for sporadic trips.

From 1914 to 1919 he had a disciple in his workshop Enrique Pérez Comendador, who made a bronze bust of his teacher.

Bilbao died on January 30, 1934, in Seville.

== List of selected works ==
His works include:

=== Drawing and paintings ===
- Two landscapes of Alcalá de Guadaíra (1890)
- Arab Sheikh (1899)
- Dream of Love (1897)
- The dream of the Virgin (1897)
- The vision of Fray Martín (1897)
- The vision of Saint Anthony (1897)
- Sketch of a statue for the rancher Félix de Urcola (1900)
- Regretful Eva (1920)

=== Sculptures ===
- Bust of Flora Bilbao (1896), Museum of Fine Arts of Seville
- Commemorative tablet of the 3rd centenary of the birth of Cervantes (1899), Church of San Pedro, Seville
- Bust of Teresa Parladé, Marchioness of Yanduri (1900)
- Statue of Antonio Cánovas del Castillo (1901), Palacio del Senado
- Copper medal with a portrait in relief of Gonzalo Bilbao (1910)
- Mausoleum of Cardinal Marcelo Spínola y Maestre (1912), Seville Cathedral
- Figures from the altarpiece of Christ of Maracaibo (1913), Seville Cathedral
- El Salvador and the apostles for the upper part of the Puerta de la Concepción (1917), Seville Cathedral
- Restoration of the Virgin of the Patronage of the Hermandad del Cachorro (1921), Seville
- Figure of the Arts of the Monument to Alfonso XII (1922), Madrid
- Statue of Ferdinand III of Castile (1924), Seville (Note: Bilbao made this sculpture of Saint Ferdinand with a scepter. The monument was completed in 1924.)
- Temple of the Niño Jesús del Dulce Nombre (1925), Santa María Magdalena, Seville
- Medallion with a portrait in relief of Francisco Mateos Gago for his commemorative tombstone (1930)

== Literature ==
- Moriana Gómez, Mario (2010). El escultor sevillano Joaquín Bilbao Martínez, 1864-1934 (in Spanish). Diputación de Sevilla. ISBN 978-84-7798-282-1.
- Álvarez Santalo, León Carlos (1999). Las cofradías de Sevilla en el siglo de las crisis (in Spanish). Universidad de Sevilla. ISBN 978-84-472-0510-3.
