= Ciril Amorós =

Spanish footballer (1904–?)

- Born: Ciril Amorós Bohem; 18 March 1904 (age 122); Valencia, Spain

Ciril Amorós Bohem (18 March 1904 — Unknown) was a Spanish footballer.

Born in València, he was the grandson of Ciril Amorós i Pastor, and spent his youth in Madrid, playing football in the German Institute, Areneros FC and Racing Madrid. In 1921 he moved to Germany, country of birth of his mother, where he played for Victoria Hamburg and then, during a short time in Barcelona, he would join RCD Espanyol.

Amorós joined Valencia during the 1924–25 season, staying in the club for a decade and gaining the promotion to first division. At Mestalla he was remembered as an elegant and effective player, shy outside the pitch. Despite that, he was a player with a strong mood, and served as the team captain.

Alongside Pasarín, he was one of the players who led an incident in the Chamartín Stadium during a Copa del Rey match in 1930, when Valencia players left the pitch before the game ended as a protest against a referee's favoritism for Real Madrid, the home team.

On 21 March 1933, he received an homage in Mestalla Stadium, where he received a cup and Valencia played a friendly match.
