= Carlos Luis de Cuenca y Velasco =

Spanish journalist, writer, poet, and playwright

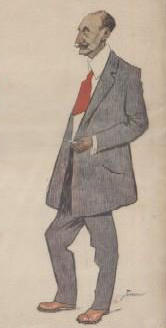
- Born: January 8, 1849; Madrid, Spain
- Died: September 2, 1927 (aged 78); Ávila, Spain
- Occupation(s): Journalist, writer, poet, playwright

Carlos Luis de Cuenca y Velasco (Madrid, January 8, 1849 – Ávila, September 2, 1927) was a Spanish journalist, writer, poet, and playwright.

== Biography ==
Born in Madrid on January 8, 1849, he studied law at the Central University of Madrid. He was head of the legal corps of the Army and worked as a journalist for La Ilustración Española y Americana, La Correspondencia Militar, Revista Popular, ABC, Heraldo de Madrid, El Debate and Blanco y Negro. He was also the director of La Ilustración de la Infancia.

He used the pseudonyms "Luis de Charles," "Fulano de Tal," and "Mefistófeles".

Among his theatrical works are Fama inmortal, La herencia de un rey, Entregar la carta, Franceses y prusianos, Mambrú, La divina zarzuela, De Madrid a la luna, Un nudo morrocotudo, La tarjeta de Canuto, Lysistrata, and Cristóbal Colón.

He died in Ávila, on September 2, 1927. After his death, he was buried in the city's cemetery, in a family pantheon. He is the great-grandfather of Luis Alberto de Cuenca.

== Bibliography ==
- Cuenca, Luis Alberto de (September 2006). Mis traducciones poéticas. pp. 30–32. ISSN 0020-4536.
- Gómez García, Manuel (1998). "Cuenca y Velasco, Carlos Luis". Diccionario Akal de Teatro. Ediciones Akal. ISBN 9788446008279.
- Ossorio y Bernard, Manuel (1903). Ensayo de un catálogo de periodistas españoles del siglo XIX. Madrid: Imprenta y litografía de J. Palacios.
