= The Immaculate Conception of San Vicente =

Painting by Bartolomé Esteban Murillo

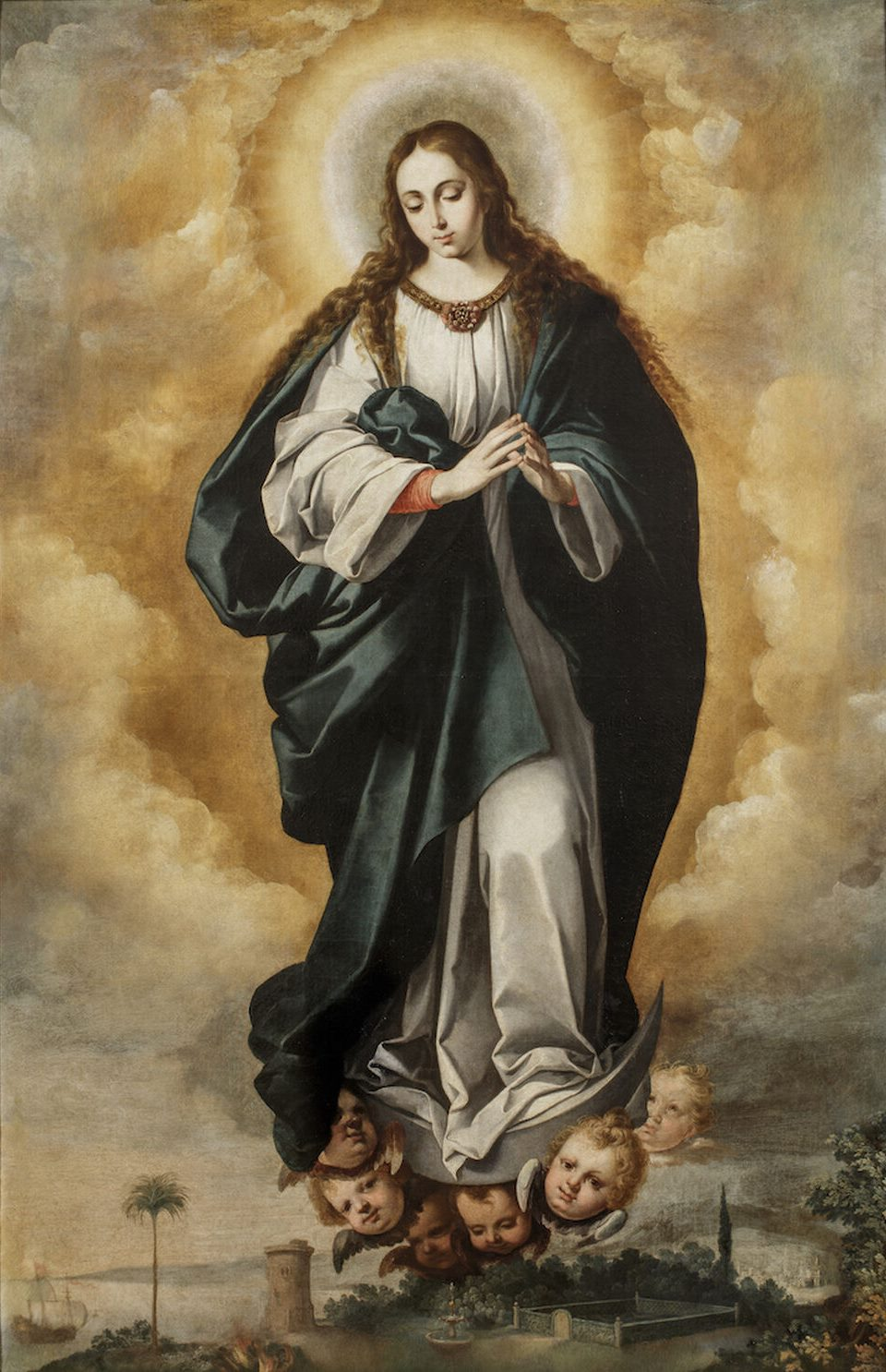
The Immaculate Conception of San Vicente (c. 1640-1645) by Bartolomé Esteban Murillo

The Immaculate Conception of San Vicent is a c. 1640-1645 oil on canvas painting by Bartolomé Esteban Murillo, now in the parish church of San Vicente Mártir in Seville.

The work has been in the church's sacristy since at least the mid 19th century and remained practically unnoticed until 2019, when its restoration was completed and it was moved within the church. At the end of 2020 an art-historical study of the work was published in Ars Magazine, arguing it was Murillo's first depiction of the Our Lady of the Immaculate Conception and was earlier than the La Colasal Immaculate Conception in the Museo de Bellas Artes de Sevilla. It argued its style was similar to other early works by Murillo, especially the two versions of his Madonna and Child with Saint Dominic (Archbishop's Palace, Seville and the former collection of the Conde de Toreno).
