= Archbishop's Palace, Seville =

Palace in Seville, Spain

Archbishop's Palace
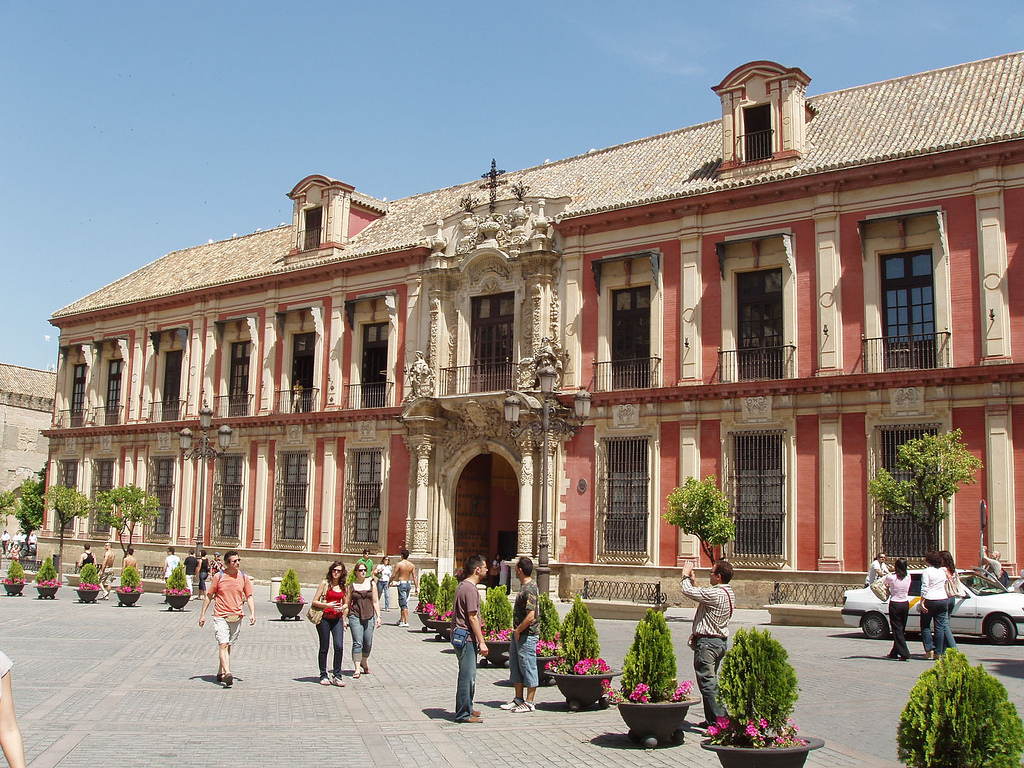
- Interactive map of the Archbishop's Palace area

General information
- Architectural style: Spanish Baroque
- Location: Seville, Spain

The Archbishop's Palace of Seville (Palacio Arzobispal) is a palace in Seville, Spain. It has served as the residence of bishops and archbishops of the episcopal sees and numerous nobleman and military figures to the present time. It is located in the southern section of Seville, in the Plaza Virgen de los Reyes, angled almost opposite the Giralda. It is situated on the northeastern side of Seville Cathedral in the neighborhood of Santa Cruz. Of Spanish Baroque architectural style, it has had the status of National Monument since 1969.

== History ==
Records of January 4, 1280, show that in 1251, following the reconquest of Seville by Ferdinand III of Castile, the king gave walled houses in the Piazza Santa Maria to the Bishop of Segovia, Remondo de Losana in order to create the Archbishop's Palace. Remondo was the first bishop of Seville after the reconquest and the first to live in the new palace.

Over the centuries, it was extended until the mid-16th century when a series of major reforms left the structure around two courtyards, covering an area of 6,700 square metres (72,000 sq ft), occupying nearly an entire block. During the brief years of the Peninsular War, the palace was used as headquarters of the Army General Command, and residence of the Marshal Jean de Dieu Soult and his officers. During Soult's stay, many paintings and sculptures were brought to the palace including that of the Beheading of St. John the Baptist and another depicting the resurrection of Lazarus.

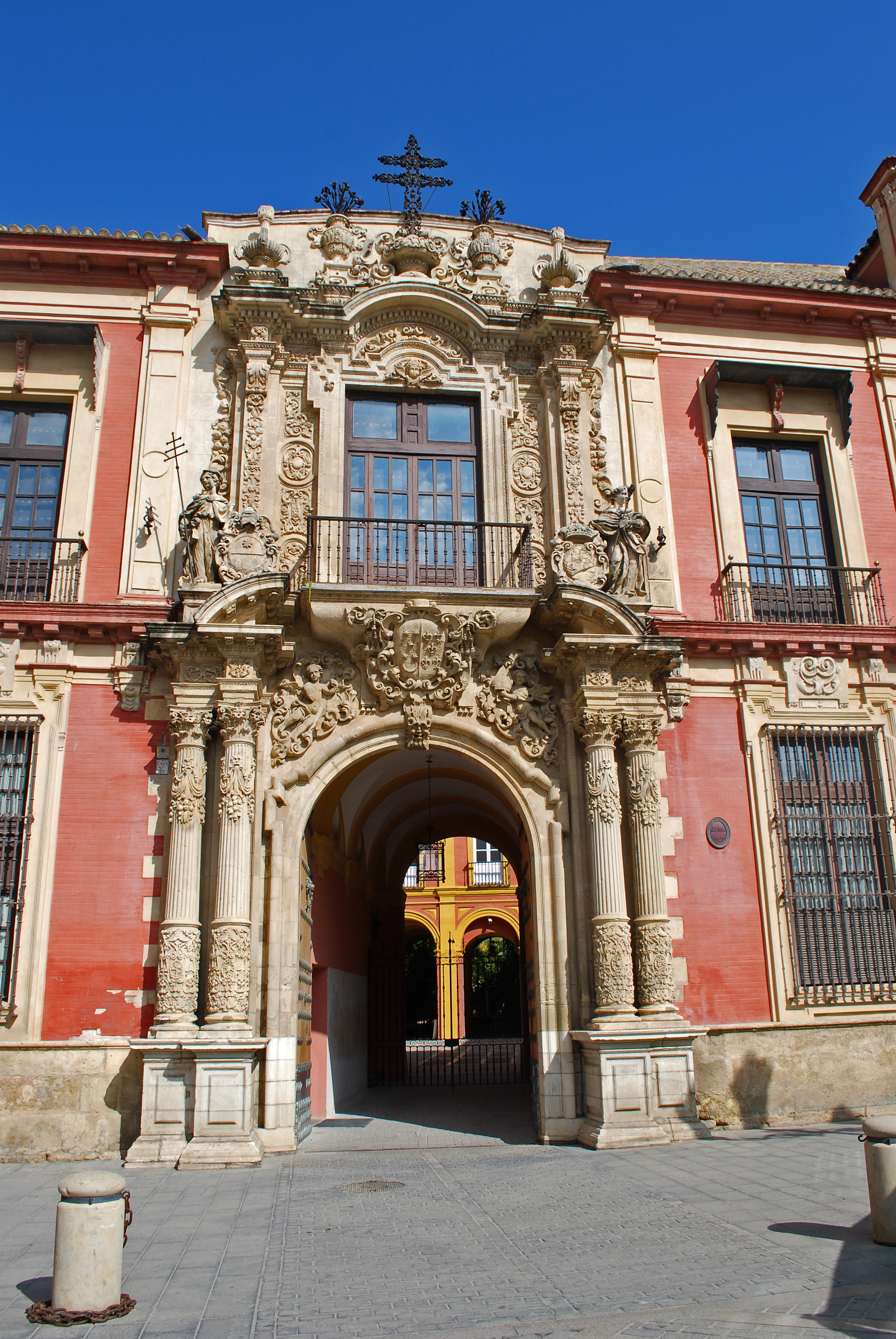
Detail of the façade.

== Architecture ==
Interior

An extensive expansion was done in 1704 by Lorenzo Fernandez de Iglesias, an important architect of the time, under the auspices of Archbishop Manuel Arias y Porres. The work joined together differing architectural styles, adorned with pilasters that are located on a broad base. The Main Hall (or Salon), painted by Antonio Mohedano, consists of four columns, two on each side of a ledge, adorned with two statues of saints. Mohedano was famous for the representations of natural objects such as birds, flowers and fruits. Hence, Juan Agustín Ceán Bermúdez in his Diccionario historico de los mas ilustres profesores de las Bellas Artes de Espana ("Dictionary of the most illustrious historical faculty of Fine Arts in Spain"), attributed to him the artistry of the ornamental ceiling elements in the Main Salon and the Prelate Gallery. In addition to the frescoed ceiling, there are 70 paintings exalting the Catholic Church. There is a mural of five Apostles by Juan de Zamora.

The broad staircase dates to the second half of the 17th century. It was designed by Fray Miguel de Ramos, a religious of the Third Order of Saint Francis, and funded by Juan de Palafox. It was constructed of coloured marble and decorated with murals attributed to Juan de Espinal.

Exterior

The building, of a red façade, has white pilasters, small iron awnings, and large balconies. There are two courtyards of the Mannerist style, built between the 17th and 18th centuries. The second has a 16th-century fountain behind this courtyard. The courtyard was at one time home to a lion cub, a present to an archbishop by a duke.

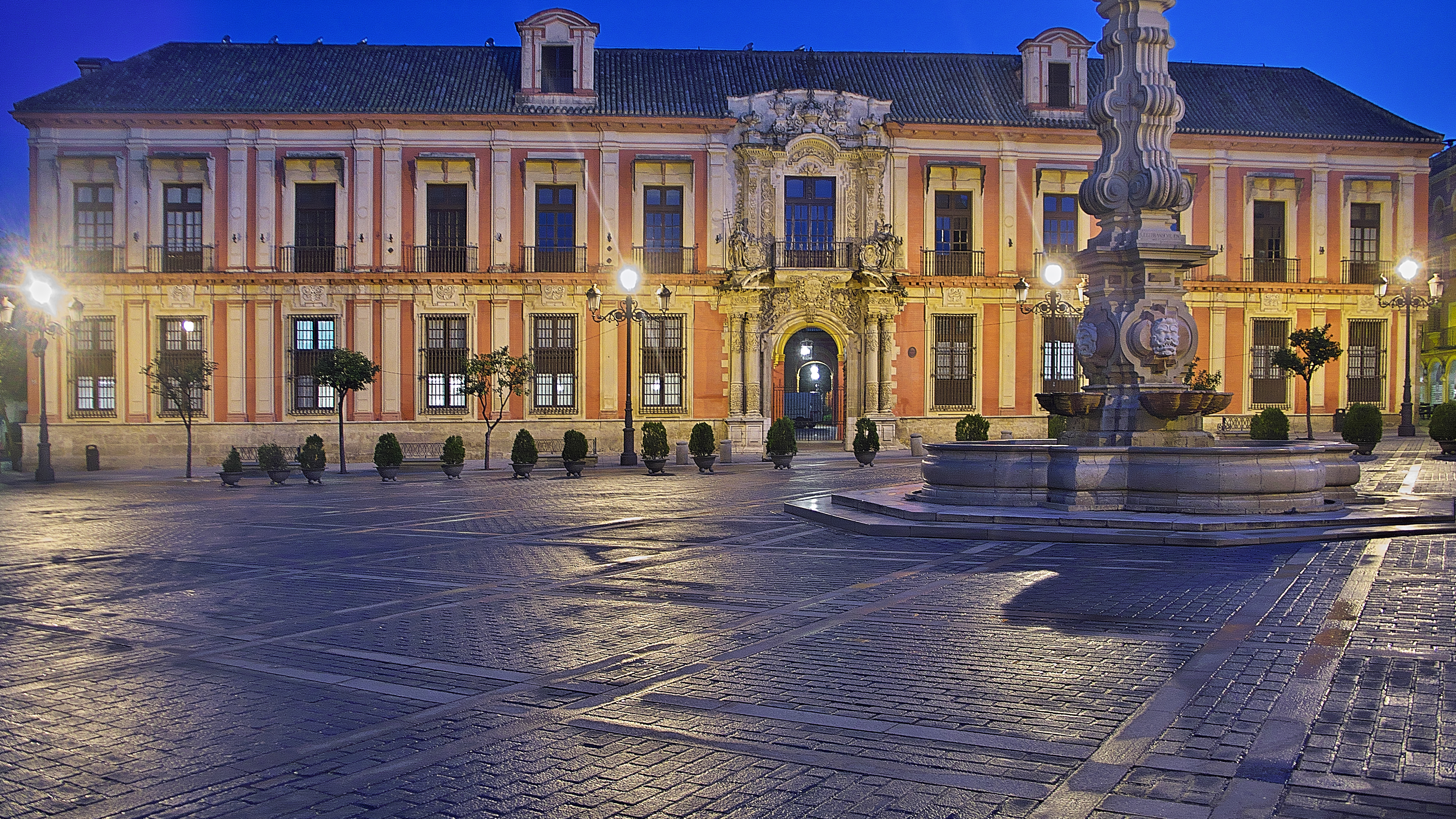
View from the Plaza de la Virgen de los Reyes.

There are two entry doors, one to the east and another to the south. The main portal, topped by vases and bronze flowers, is inscribed with vegetable motifs and displays of escutcheons. Designed by Lorenzo Fernández de Figueroa and Diego Antonio Díaz in the Spanish Baroque style, it was built in the 18th century and is a good example of Seville Baroque. Intercolumniation is present at the main door, following the width of the patio, and includes several arches, supported by small columns of marble. A cornice support two allegorical statues.

== Collections ==
The library is quite large and contains a multitude of selected works, most belonging to the ecclesiastical sciences from the days when this library was formed. The office of the Archbishop, contained with the library, retain documentation about the archdiocese of Seville, the oldest documents dating to the 14th century.

The palace also has an important artistic heritage consisting of paintings and sculptures from the Seville Baroque period, spread through the palace, surpassed only in Seville by the Museum of Fine Arts and Seville Cathedral, becoming the third gallery of the city. The palace contains works by painters such as Francisco Herrera el Viejo, Francisco Pacheco, Zurbarán, Murillo, Antonio Palomino, and Juan de Espinal. There are also collections from the Italian and Dutch baroque schools.

== See also ==
- List of Baroque residences

== Bibliography ==
- FALCÓN MÁRQUEZ, Teodoro (1993). El Palacio Arzobispal de Sevilla. Sevilla. Editorial: Caja San Fernando.
- FALCÓN MÁRQUEZ, Teodoro (1997). El Palacio Arzobispal de Sevilla. Córdoba. Editorial: Publicaciones Obra Social y Cultural CajaSur. ISBN 84-7959-193-5
