= Saint Francis Embracing Christ on the Cross =

Painting by Bartolomé Esteban Murillo

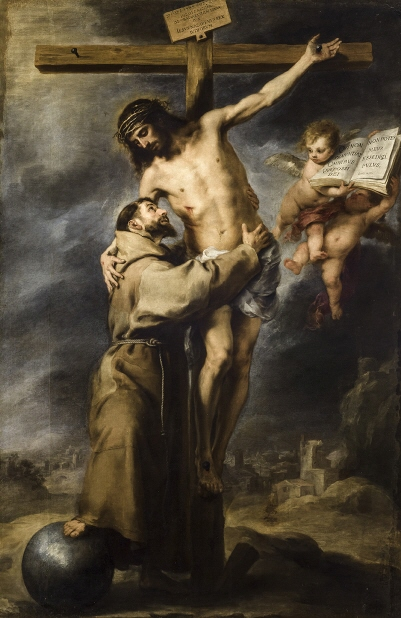
- Artist: Bartolomé Esteban Murillo
- Year: 1668-1669
- Medium: Oil on canvas
- Dimensions: 283 cm × 188 cm (111 in × 74 in)
- Location: Museum of Fine Arts of Seville, Seville

Saint Francis Embracing Christ on the Cross or Allegory of Saint Francis' Renunciation of the Material World to Follow Jesus is an oil on canvas painting by Bartolomé Esteban Murillo, created in 1668-1669, now held in the Museum of Fine Arts of Seville.

== History and description ==
It originally formed part of a series of paintings on the distinctive elements of Franciscan spirituality commissioned from the artist by the Capuchin Order for their monastery church in Seville. The work's subject was also treated by other artists, most notably Francesc Ribalta in around 1658 for the Capuchins in Valencia. That convent contributed to the foundation of the convent in Seville and so may have suggested the subject to Murillo.

The composition symbolises the crucial moment in Francis of Assisi's life when he renounced all worldly goods to embrace the religious life, pushing away a globe (symbolising the world) with his right foot. Next to the cross two cherubs hold an open book showing the Vulgate version of a passage from the Gospel of Luke 14:33 ("In the same way, those of you who do not give up everything you have cannot be my disciples").
