= Susana Ben Susón =

Legendary converso who betrayed her father in 15th-century Seville

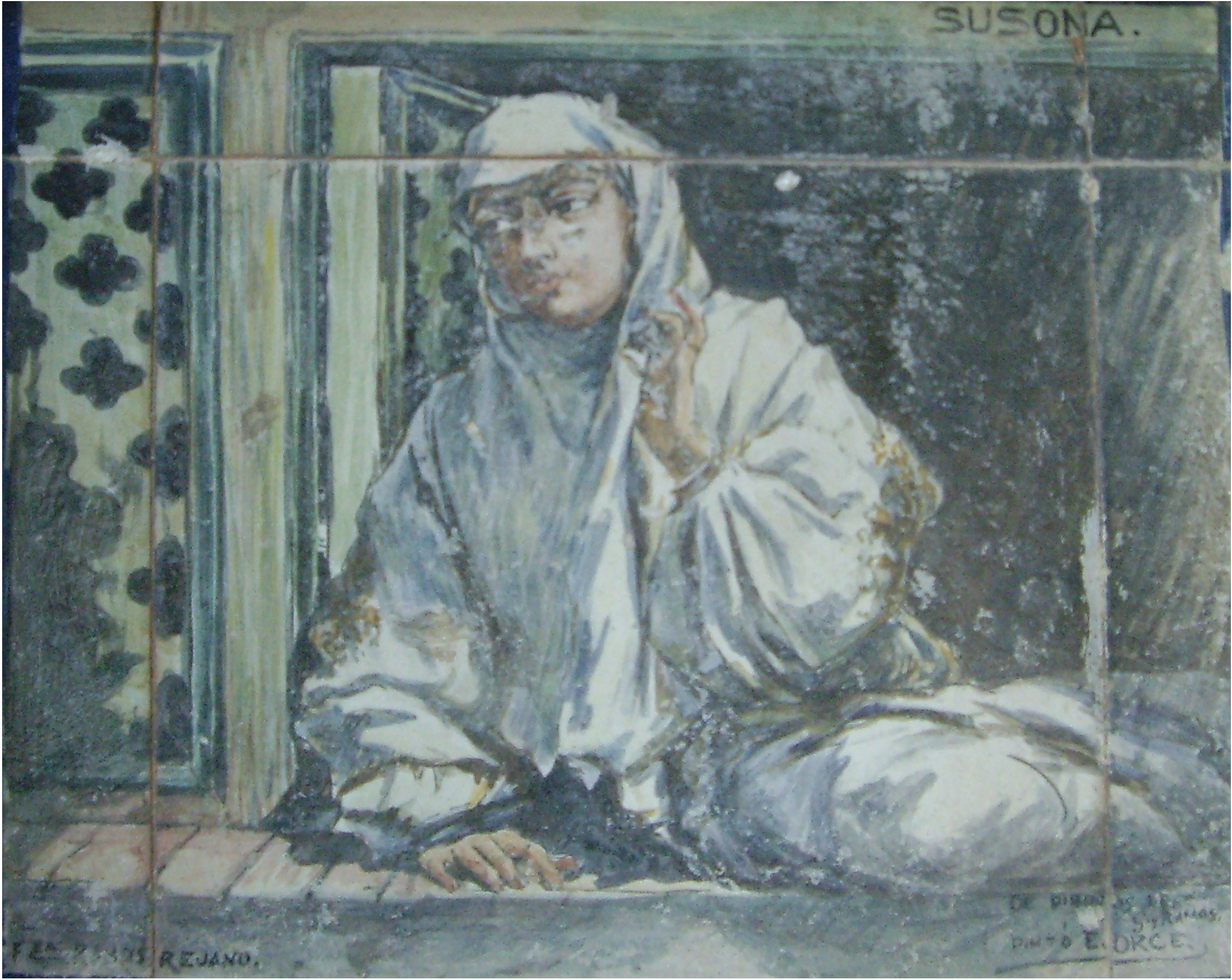
Susona the beautiful commemorated in a tile of a roundabout Maria Luisa Park in Seville, Spain

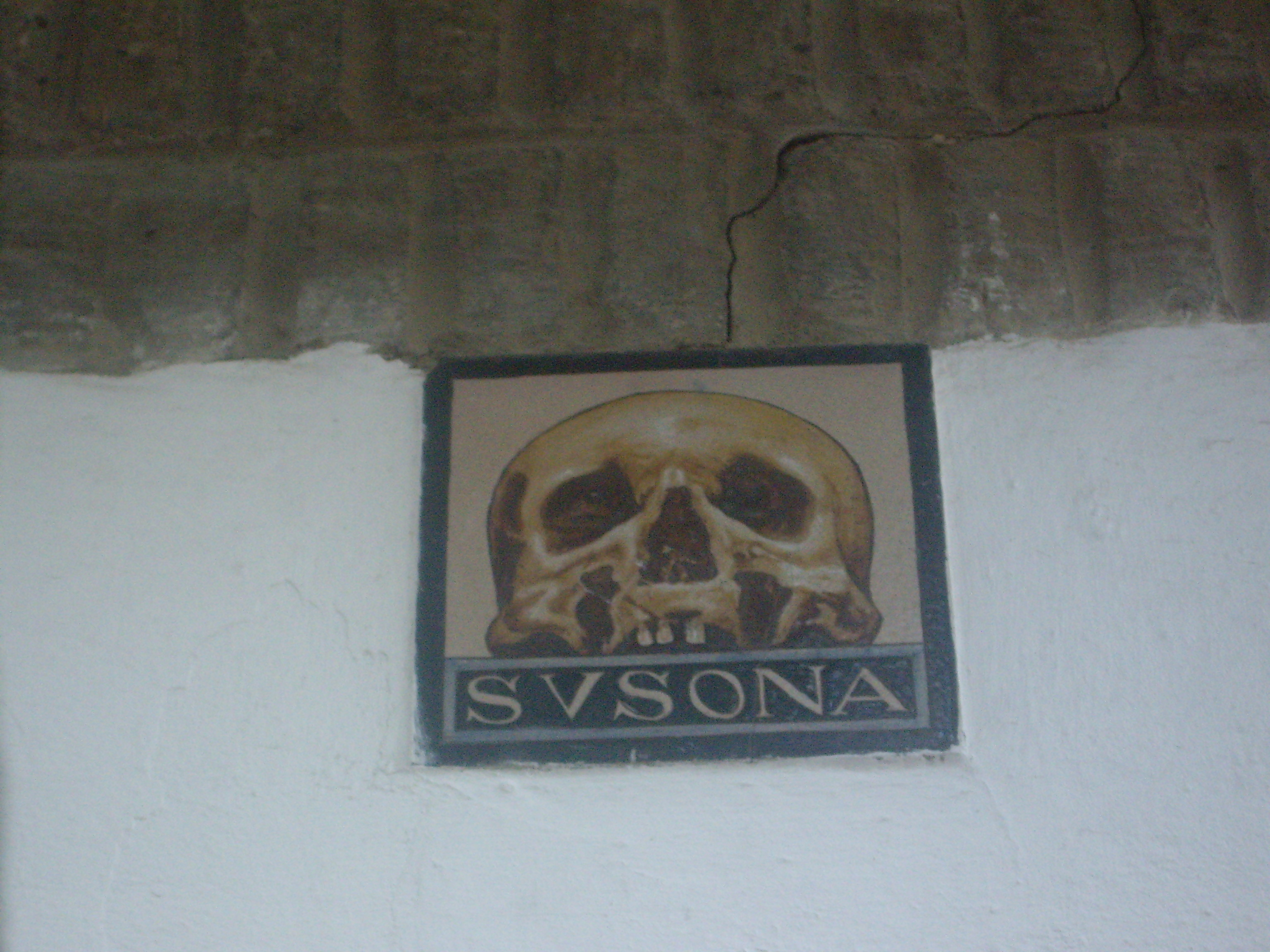
Skull of Susona in the door where her old home was

Susana ben Susón, known as La Susona, is a figure in Sevillian legend, said to have lived during the early years of the Spanish Inquisition in the 15th century. The beautiful daughter of a wealthy converso—a New Christian of Jewish background—she is said to have betrayed a secret plan of conversos, led by her father, who intended to resist the Inquisition, to her Christian lover. The group was arrested and executed. Consumed by remorse, Susona reportedly entered a convent before leaving it to live the rest of her life in poverty and shame.

== Biography ==
Susana ben Susón was the daughter of Diego Susón, a wealthy man who belonged to the community of conversos—Jews who had converted to Christianity but were often suspected of secretly practicing Judaism.

In an attempt to secure their continued existence and regain their previous standing in Spanish life, around 1480, the Jews in Seville, Carmona, and Utrera plotted a conspiracy to destabilize the state and one of its leaders was the father of Susona. The conspirators met at the home of Diego Susón to plot the spread of their plans, including the release of prisoners to create disorder, benefit the Muslim powers, and carry out violent uprisings in major cities.

According to the legend, Susana fell in love with a Christian man named Guzmán, and when she learned of the plans, she revealed them to him. Her lover went to the chief assistant of the city of Seville, don Diego de Merlo, to inform him of what Susona had told him. Diego de Merlo investigated the allegations and arrested all participants. Her father and six others were sentenced to death and burned at the stake as apostates.

Susona suffered great guilt for having betrayed her father and hid herself in a convent. Upon her death, she is said to have requested that her skull be displayed on the door of her house in the Barrio de Santa Cruz, to remind people of her betrayal. However, the head decomposed and was replaced by an oil lamp. Subsequently, the lamp was changed to a tile on which her skull is displayed.

La Bella Susona in a tile of a roundabout Maria Luisa Park of Seville, Spain. The tile is based on a painting by José García Ramos and is drawn by Enrique Orcel in the Factory of Manuel Ramos Rejano.
