= Saint Anthony with the Christ Child =

Saint Anthony with the Christ Child is the name of the following paintings:

- Saint Anthony with the Christ Child (Murillo), the name of two 17th-century paintings by Bartolomé Esteban Murillo
- The Vision of Saint Anthony of Padua (Pittoni), also known as Saint Anthony with the Christ Child, a 1730 oil-on-canvas painting by Giambattista Pittoni
