= Alfonso Grosso Sánchez =

Spanish painter

- Born: September 1, 1893; Seville
- Died: December 12, 1983 (aged 90); Seville
- Education: Royal Academy of Fine Arts of Saint Isabel of Hungary
- Occupation: Spanish painter
- Employer: Museum of Fine Arts of Seville

Alfonso Grosso Sánchez (September 1, 1893 in Seville – December 12, 1983 in Seville) was a Spanish painter.

== Biography ==
Sánchez trained at the Royal Academy of Fine Arts of Saint Isabel of Hungary in Seville, being a disciple of José García Ramos and Gonzalo Bilbao.

In 1940, he was appointed professor at the Royal Academy of Fine Arts in Seville, where he became professor of color and composition. He was also director of the Museum of Fine Arts of Seville. His work, an estimated 2,000 canvases, has been shown in exhibits in Spain, Buenos Aires, and New York.

=== Influences ===
Sánchez's work was done through traditional, religious, and portrait themes. Much of his work depicts Andalusian characters, like dancers, gypsies, bullfighters, and cantaoras. Another inspiration to him was religious building interiors, where he often focused on cloistered convents. In 1920, Sánchez began working in portraiture.
