= Saint Thomas of Villanova Giving Alms =

Painting by Bartolomé Esteban Murillo

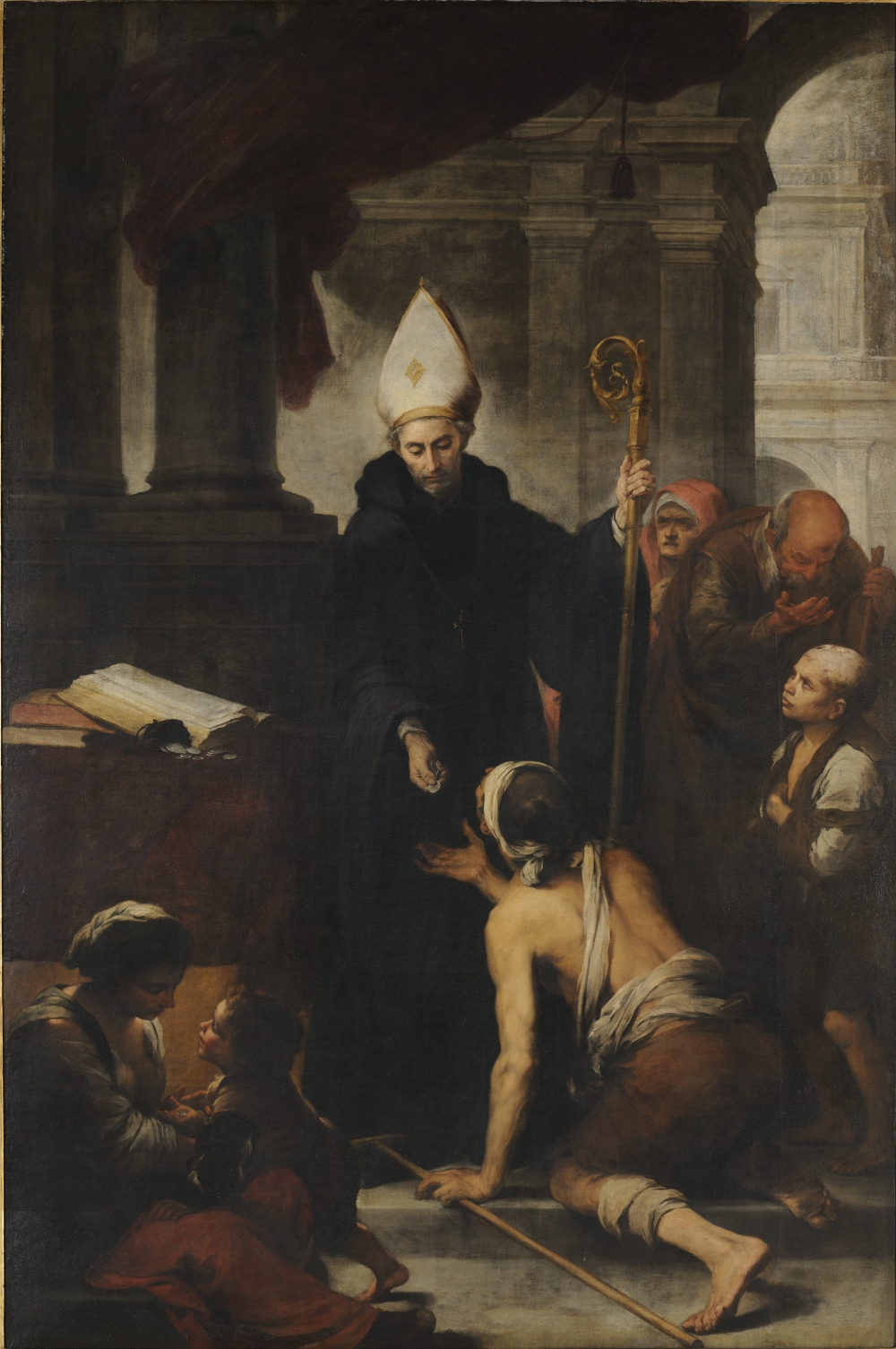
Saint Thomas of Villanova Giving Alms (c. 1668) by Bartolomé Esteban Murillo

Saint Thomas of Villanova Giving Alms is an oil on canvas painting by Murillo, created c. 1668, originally produced for the Capuchin monastery in Seville and now in the Museum of Fine Arts of Seville.
