= Francisco Soria Aedo =

Spanish painter (1898–1965)

Francisco Soria Aedo (1898–1965) was a Spanish figurative painter who started art in Granada at the hands of his teacher López Mezquita. He was awarded important prizes, such as the second medal at the National Exhibition of 1924 for his work Arabian types and first at the International Exhibition of Barcelona in 1929 for his oil painting Christmas Eve in the village. He was a professor of color at the Superior School of Fine Arts of San Fernando in Madrid.

His work, which is represented in the Museum of Fine Arts of Seville and the Museum of Fine Arts of Granada, pays special attention to the representation of ordinary people from Andalusia, Castille and Morocco, focusing on rich colour and dynamic lighting. Aedo also painted scenes of classical mythology, such as of satyrs and nymphs. He is famous for his skill in depicting facial expressions, particularly broad smiles - an uncommon depiction in classical and realist art.
