= Juan Simón Gutiérrez =

Spanish painter

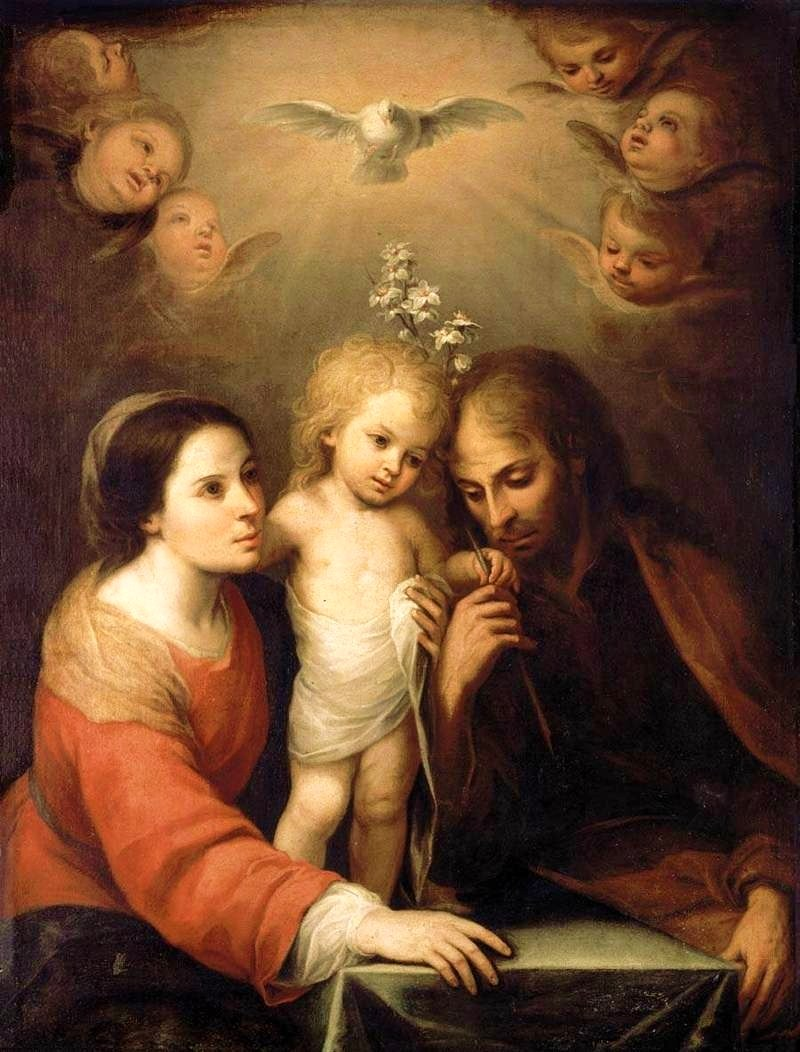
The Holy Family by Juan Simón Gutiérrez, 1680

Juan Simón Gutiérrez (1634-1718) was a Spanish Baroque painter.

Gutiérrez was born in Medina-Sidonia. He moved to Seville where he met and studied under Bartolomé Esteban Murillo, as evidenced by the influence on Gutiérrez's works. He enrolled in the Academia de Bellas Artes (Seville) between 1664 and 1667, the year he married. In 1680 he obtained the position of being responsible for the entrance examinations of the new students of the Academy.

Only two known signed works have been identified: the Madonna and Child with Saint Augustine, dated 1686, in the Convent of the Trinity of Carmona, which is perhaps his masterpiece, treated as a sacred conversation in which both males and females are interpreted with unquestionable quality, and the other Death of Santo Domingo assisted by Virgin, dated 1711 is preserved in the Museum of Fine Arts of Seville. Other works attributed can be seen in the Wallace Collection, Los Angeles County Museum of Art, in the church of St. Mary the Crowned of Medina Sidonia, and private collections.

== External links and references ==
- Pérez Sánchez, Alfonso E. (1992). Baroque Painting in Spain 1600-1750. Madrid: Ediciones Chair. ISBN 84-376-0994-1.
- Valdivieso, E. and Serrera, JM, Season of Murillo. Antecedents and consequences of his painting, exhibition catalog, Palace of Aranjuez, 1982 SE 225-1982 Legal Deposit.
