= Andrés Parladé =

Spanish painter (1859–1933)

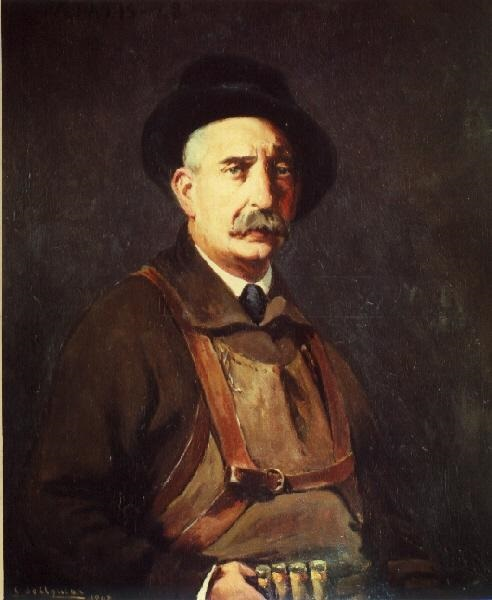
Self-portrait, dressed as a hunter (1907)

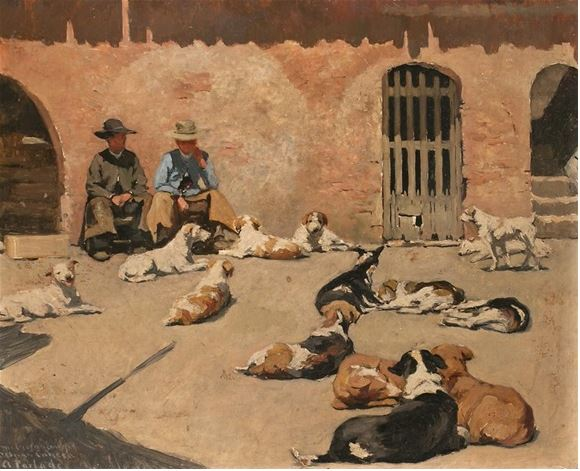
Scene with Dogs (1902)

Andrés Parladé y Heredia, after 1903, the third Count of Aguiar (1 June 1859 – 4 April 1933) was a Spanish genre and portrait painter who is best remembered for his hunting-related scenes, many of which feature dogs.

== Biography ==
He began his artistic studies in his hometown, Málaga, with the portrait and history painter, Moreno Carbonero. Later, he moved to Seville, where he studied law.

In 1882, he went to Paris, having decided to devote himself entirely to painting, and studied with Léon Bonnat at the École des Beaux Arts. After his stay in Paris, he travelled to Rome, where he remained until 1891, when he settled permanently in Seville.

In 1902, he was named an Academician at the Real Academia de Bellas Artes de Santa Isabel de Hungría. The following year, he succeeded his father, Andrés Parladé y Sánchez de Quirós, as Count of Aguiar. In 1909, he was appointed Senator for the Province of Seville. With a recommendation from the Academia, he was placed in charge of the excavations being carried out at the archaeological site in the ancient Roman city of Italica, near Santiponce, in 1919. This would be his primary occupation until his death.

His paintings may be divided into two very distinct stages. In his first stage, which lasted through the end of the 19th century, he followed in the steps of his teacher, Carbonero, and focused on painting historical scenes. In his second stage, begun around the turn of the century, he switched to a modified costumbrista style, originally focused on bullfighting and notable for his attention to detail. Later, he turned to peasant scenes and animals; primarily dogs and horses. Many of his animal scenes involve hunting; a sport that he himself was fond of.

He participated in numerous exhibitions outside of Spain; including London (1888), Berlin (1890), París (1899) and San Francisco (1915). His works may be seen at the Museo de Bellas Artes de Sevilla, among several others.

== Sources ==
- Biography @ the Real Academia de la Historia
- Biography @ the Museo del Prado
- Enrique Valdivieso, Historia de la pintura sevillana, 1992. Guadalquivir S.L.. Ediciones. ISBN 84-86080-76-2.
