= Saint Hugh in the Carthusian Refectory =

Painting by Francisco de Zurbarán

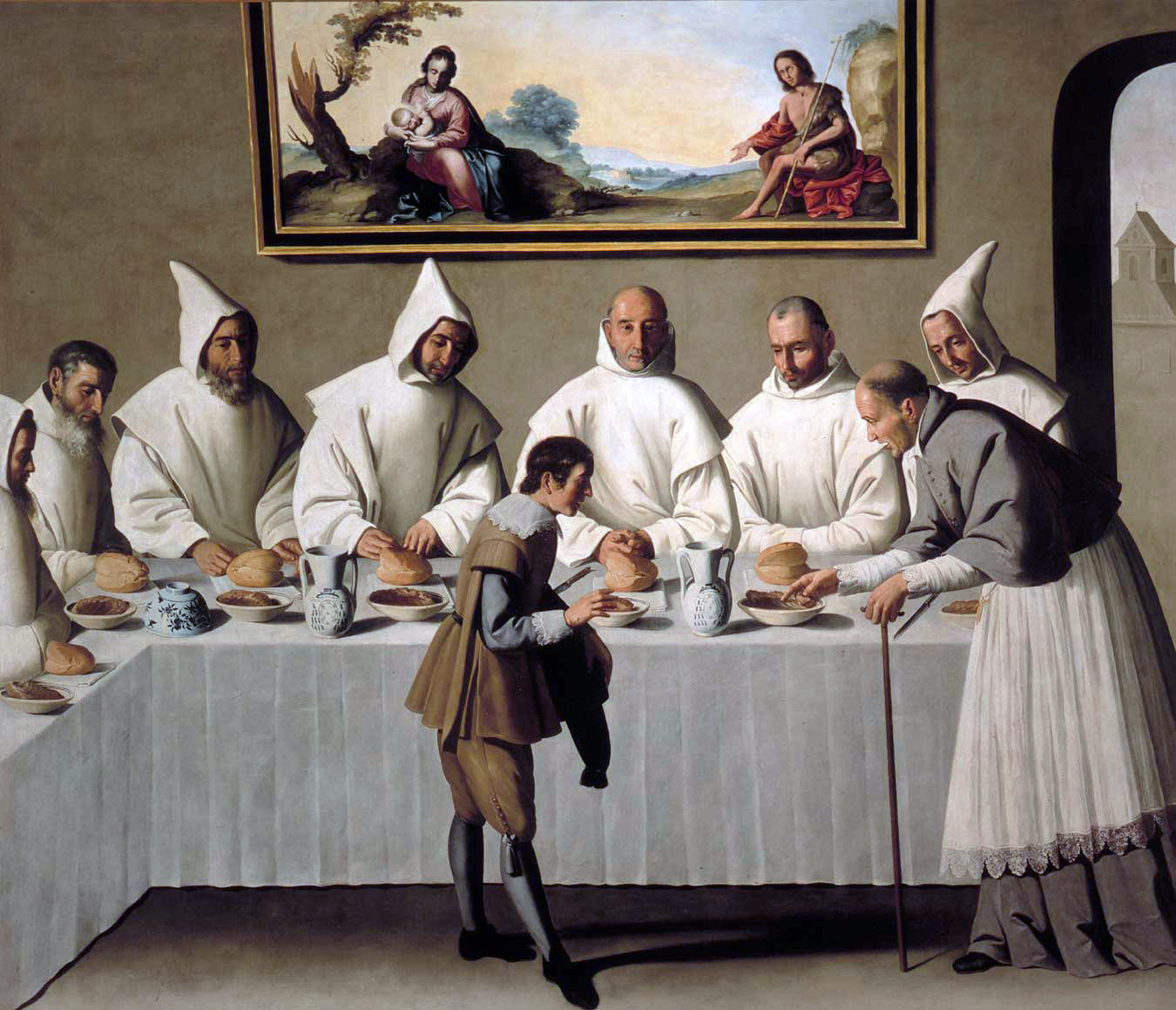
- Artist: Francisco de Zurbarán
- Medium: Oil on canvas
- Dimensions: 262 cm × 307 cm (103 in × 121 in)
- Location: Museum of Fine Arts, Seville

Saint Hugh in the Carthusian Refectory is a painting of 1655 by Francisco de Zurbarán, now in the Museum of Fine Arts of Seville.

It shows Saint Bruno of Cologne and the six other founder members of the Carthusian order being served a meal by Saint Hugh of Châteauneuf (then Bishop of Grenoble) and his page. One day Hugh had sent them meat and, during a discussion on whether it was right to break their fast and accept the gift, they fell into an ecstatic dream. Forty-five days later Hugh sent a message that he was coming to see them, but his messenger returned and reported that the Carthusians were still sitting in front of the meat despite it being Lent. Hugh arrived at the monastery and as the monks woke up Hugh asked Bruno the date in the church calendar. He told him a date forty-five days earlier and explained their debate over whether to accept his meat. Hugh then leaned towards their plates and saw the meat turn into ash. The monks thus came to the decision that there could be absolutely no exception to their rule against eating meat.

In front of each Carthusian is a terracotta bowl with meat and pieces of bread. Also on the table are two terracotta jugs, an overturned bowl and two abandoned knives for cutting the meat.
