= Eduardo Cano de la Peña =

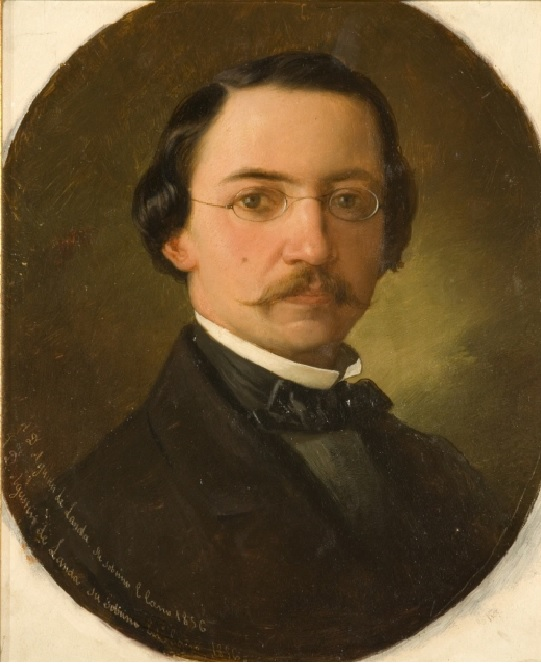
Self-portrait (1856)

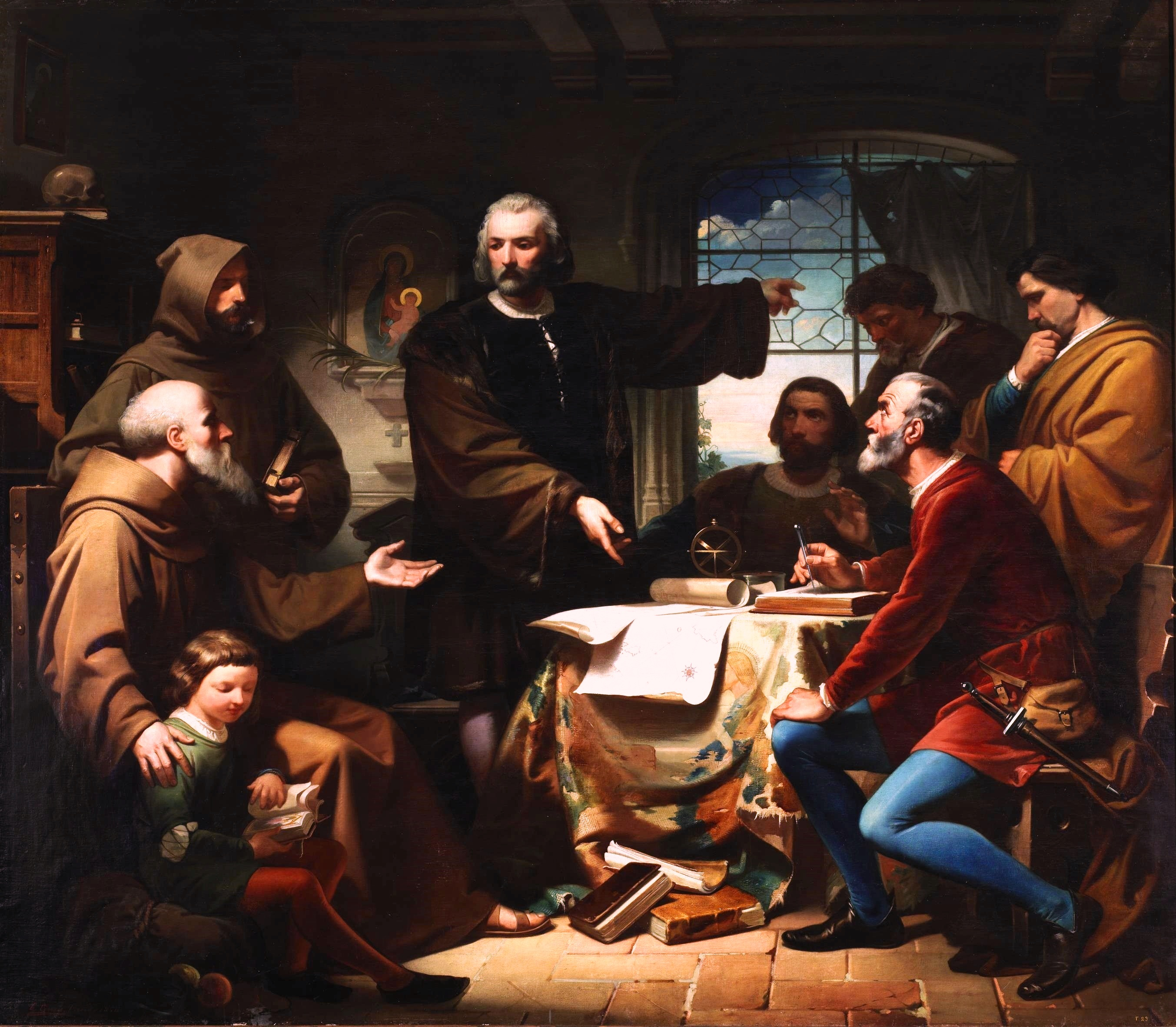
Columbus at the Rábida Friary

Eduardo Cano de la Peña (1823, Madrid - 4 April 1897, Seville) was a Spanish painter in the Romantic style; specializing in historical scenes.

== Life and work ==
His father was the architect, Melchor Cano. In 1826, his family moved to Seville, where his father had been appointed Municipal Architect.

He began by studying architecture at the Real Escuela de las Tres Nobles Artes de Sevilla, but soon followed his inclinations to become an artist instead and was eventually appointed an assistant professor. After both of his parents had died, he continued his studies in Madrid, at the Real Academia de Bellas Artes de San Fernando, under the direction of José and Federico Madrazo and Carlos Luis de Ribera y Fieve.

Later, he went to Paris, where he created two of his best known works. The first, Cristóbal Colón en el Convento de la Rábida, was awarded the gold medal at the Exposición Nacional of 1856, and is now in the Palacio del Senado. The second, Entierro del condestable Don Álvaro de Luna, also won a gold medal, at the Exposición Nacional in 1858, and is now in the Museo del Prado.

Upon returning to Seville, he was named Conservator of the Museo de Bellas Artes, as well as Professor of color and composition at the Escuela de Bellas Artes. His devotion to teaching led to his producing a relatively small number of works; estimated at approximately 150. He also directed all of the restorative work at the museum and acted as its representative on official occasions.

Although he is best known for his historical scenes, he also painted portraits, including one of the writer, Fernán Caballero (Cecilia Böhl de Faber). In addition, he created some works in Costumbrista style, watercolors, engravings, and some illustrations for the journal, El Museo Universal. Outside of the art world, he was a strong defender of Hispanic traditions, supported an equal education for men and women, and was an amateur musician.
