= Francisco Barrera =

Spanish painter

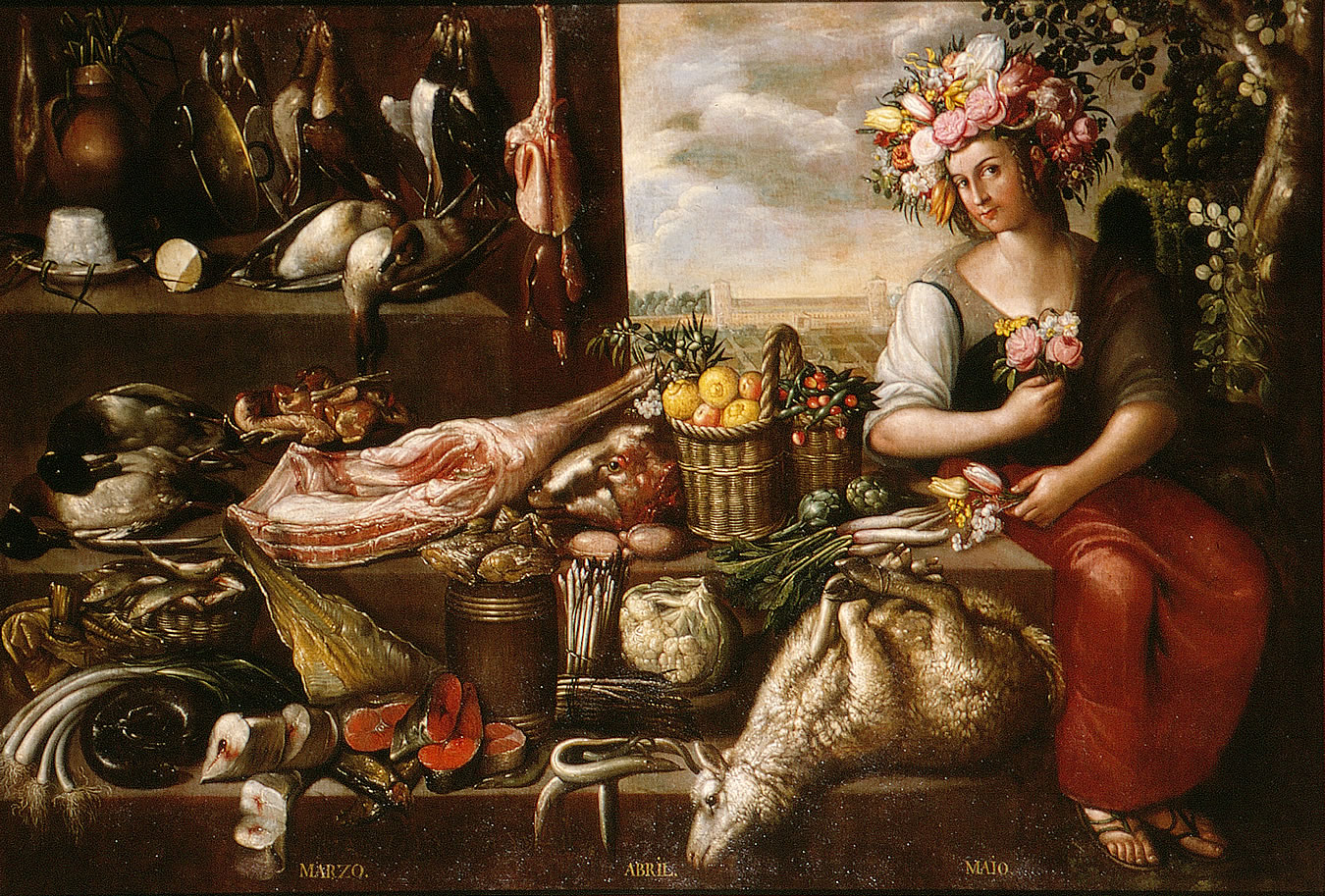
Primavera, Spring, made in 1638, part of a series of 4 paintings depicting the four seasons. Now at the Museum of Fine Arts of Seville.

Francisco Barrera was a Spanish painter, best known for his appeal on behalf of his fellow artists against taxes proposed by the Spanish government in 1640.
