= La Colosal Immaculate Conception =

Painting by Bartolomé Esteban Murillo

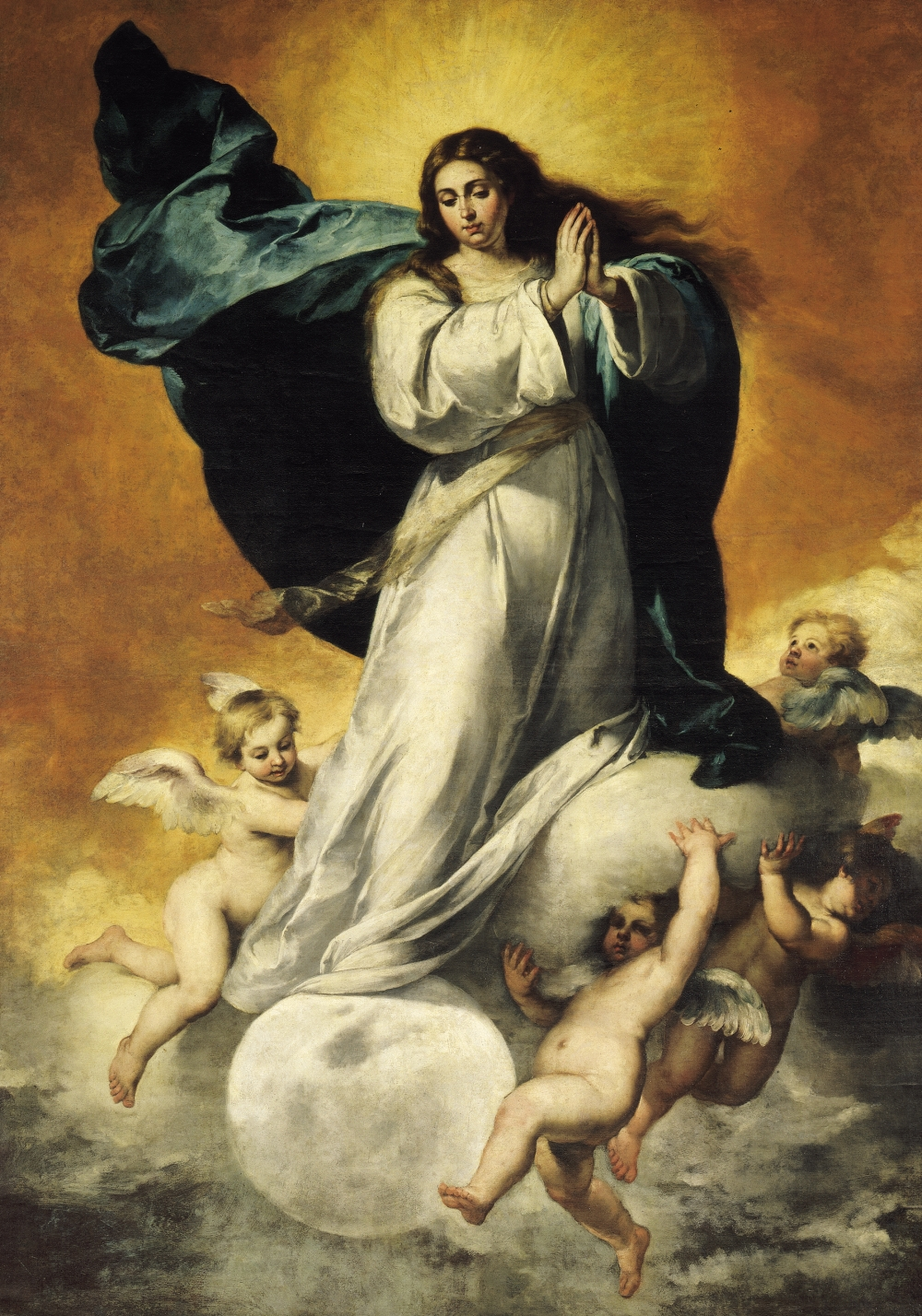
La Colosal Immaculate Conception (c. 1645-1655) by Bartolomé Esteban Murillo

The La Colosal Immaculate Conception is a c. 1645-1655 oil on canvas painting by Bartolomé Esteban Murillo in the Museum of Fine Arts of Seville.
