= Saint Anthony with the Christ Child (Murillo) =

Painting by Bartolomé Esteban Murillo

Saint Anthony with the Christ Child refers to two paintings by Bartolomé Esteban Murillo, dating to 1665–1666 and 1668–1669 and both now in the Museum of Fine Arts of Seville.

== Gallery ==
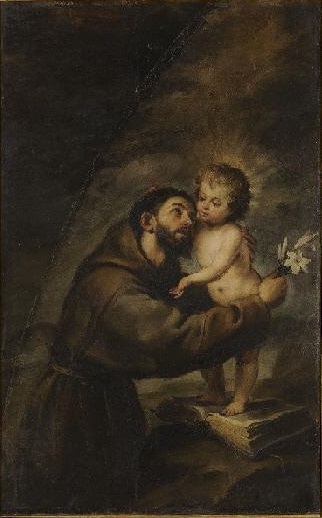
1665–1666

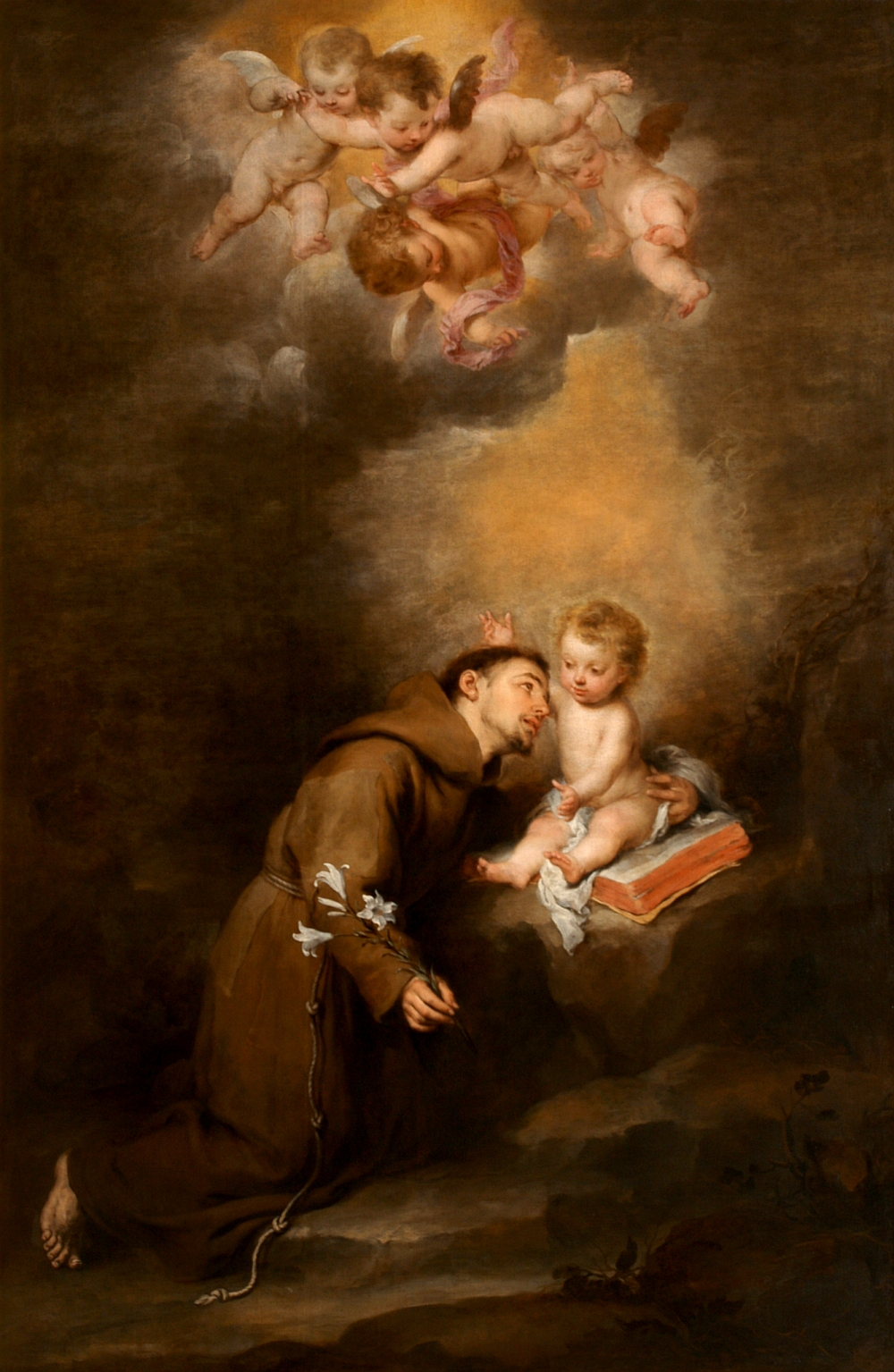
1668–1669
