= Madonna and Child of the Napkin =

C. 1666 painting by Bartolomé Esteban Murillo

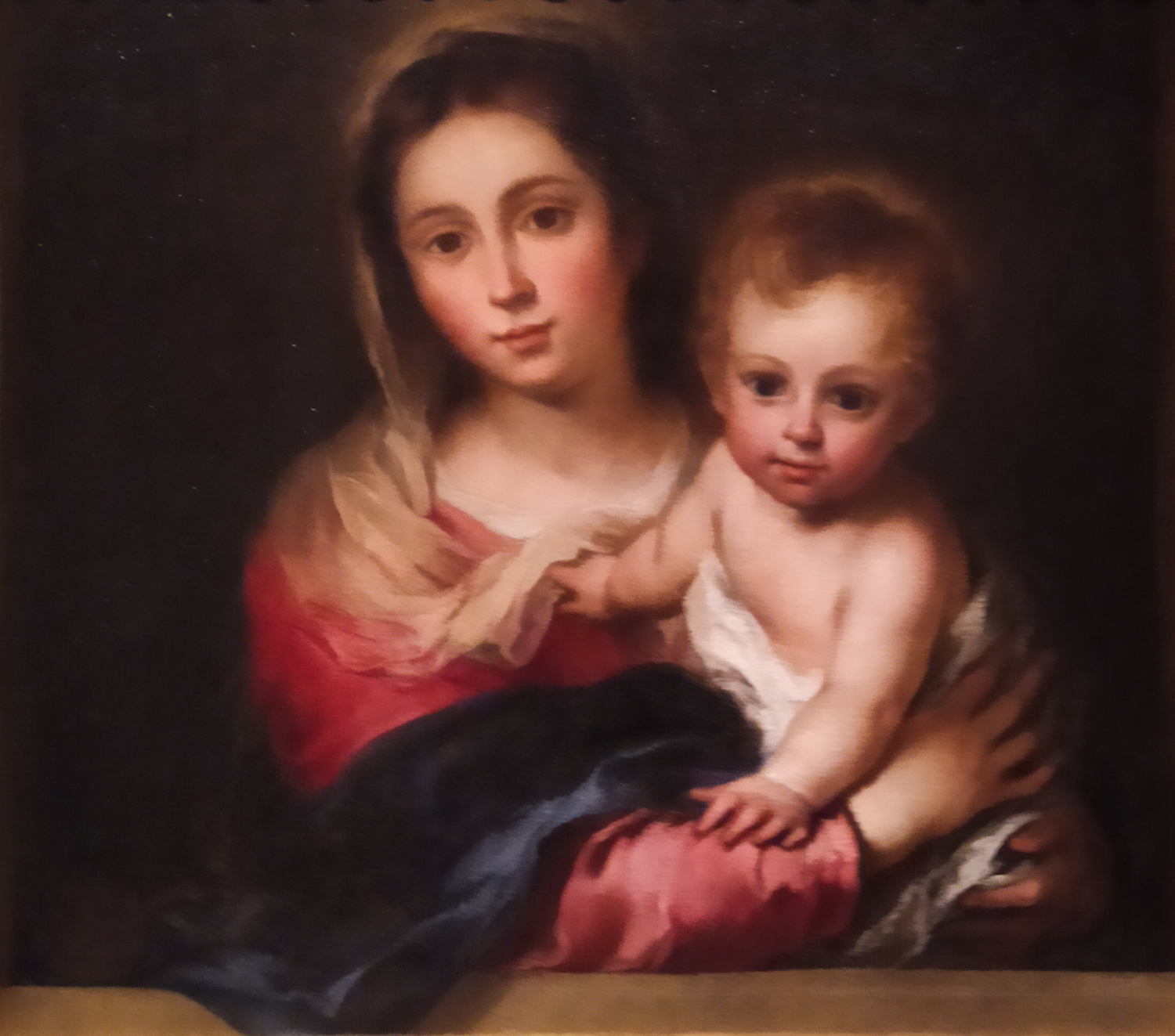
Madonna and Child of the Napkin (c. 1666) by Bartolomé Esteban Murillo

Madonna and Child of the Napkin or Our Lady of the Napkin is an oil on canvas painting by Bartolomé Esteban Murillo, created c. 1666, as part of the altarpiece of the church of the Capuchin monastery in Seville and now in the Museum of Fine Arts of Seville. The vivid colour and delicacy of forms are reminiscent of Raphael, while the atmosphere is influenced by Velázquez and Rubens.

== History ==
The French general Soult, a great admirer of Murillo, attempted to loot the work but the Capuchins were able to get it and other works to Gibraltar in 1810, where they remained until the end of the Peninsular War in 1814. The work became state property in 1836 as part of the confiscation of church goods by the Mendizábal government and was assigned to the new Museum of Fine Arts of Seville.

== Name ==
The origin of its name is first recorded in the 1833 A Dictionary of Spanish Painting, edited by O'Neill. One version relates that the Capuchin friars found a napkin had vanished from their stores, but it was returned to them a few days later by Murillo with a drawing of the Madonna. Another states that one of the Capuchin friars privately asked Murillo for an image of the Madonna and Child to aid his private devotions in his cell but - unable to buy a canvas for him to paint it on - had him paint it on a napkin instead.
