= Juan de Espinal =

Spanish historical painter

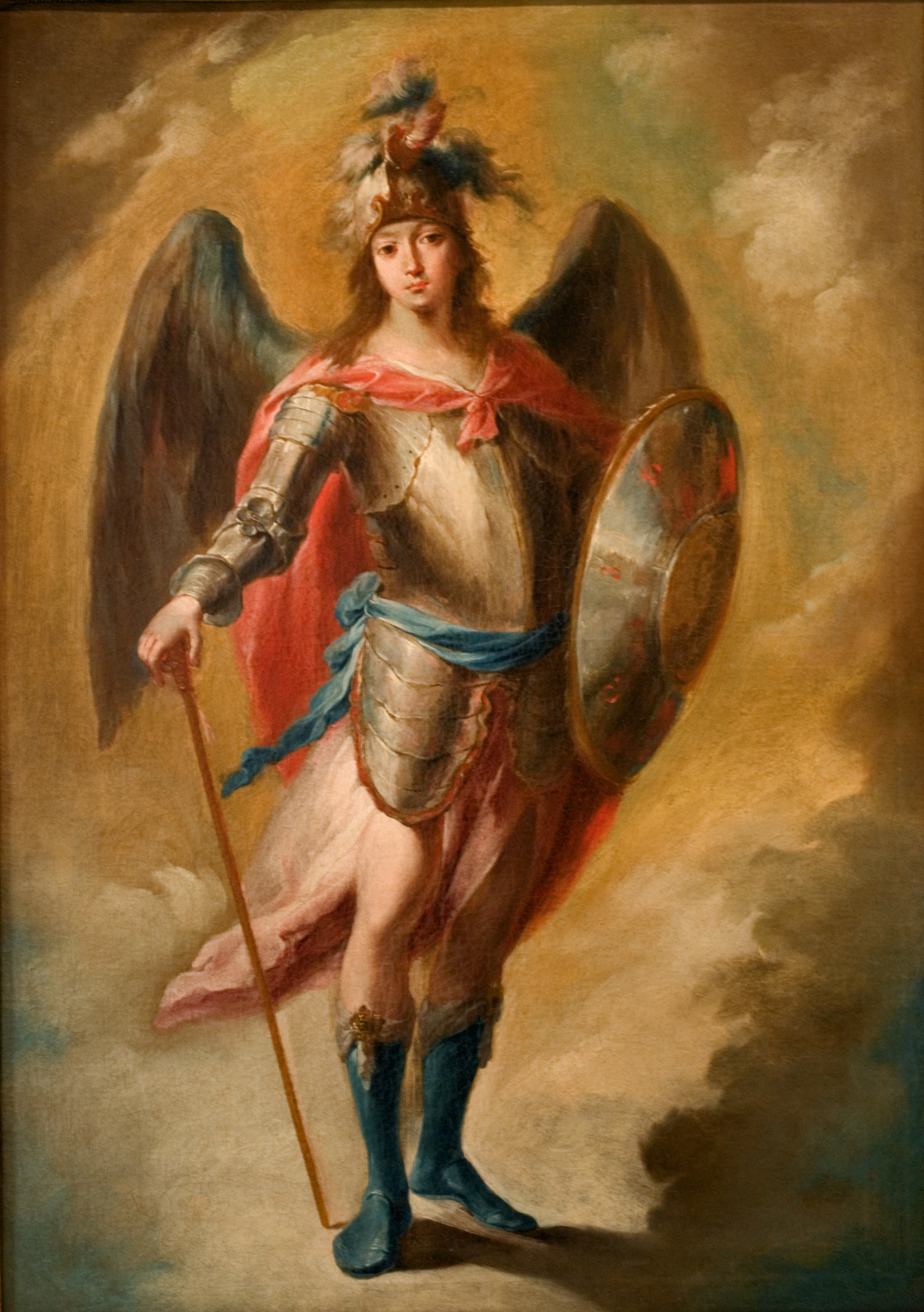
Saint Michael, 1780, now in the Museum of Fine Arts of Seville.

Juan de Espinal (1714-1783), a Spanish historical painter, was a native of Seville. He was the son and pupil of Gregorio Espinal, who was also a painter, but he afterwards entered the school of Domingo Martinez, whose daughter he married. He was chosen director of the School of Design which Cean Bermudez and other lovers of art established at Seville. Cean Bermudez says that he possessed more genius than any of his contemporaries, and but for his bad training and indolence would have been the best painter whom Seville had produced since the time of Murillo. A visit to Madrid late in life made apparent his misspent time, and he returned saddened and abashed to Seville, where he died in 1783. His chief works were scenes from the life of St. Jerome, painted for the monastery of San Geronimo de Buenavista, and now in the Seville Museum, and some frescoes in the collegiate church of San Salvador.

== Gallery ==
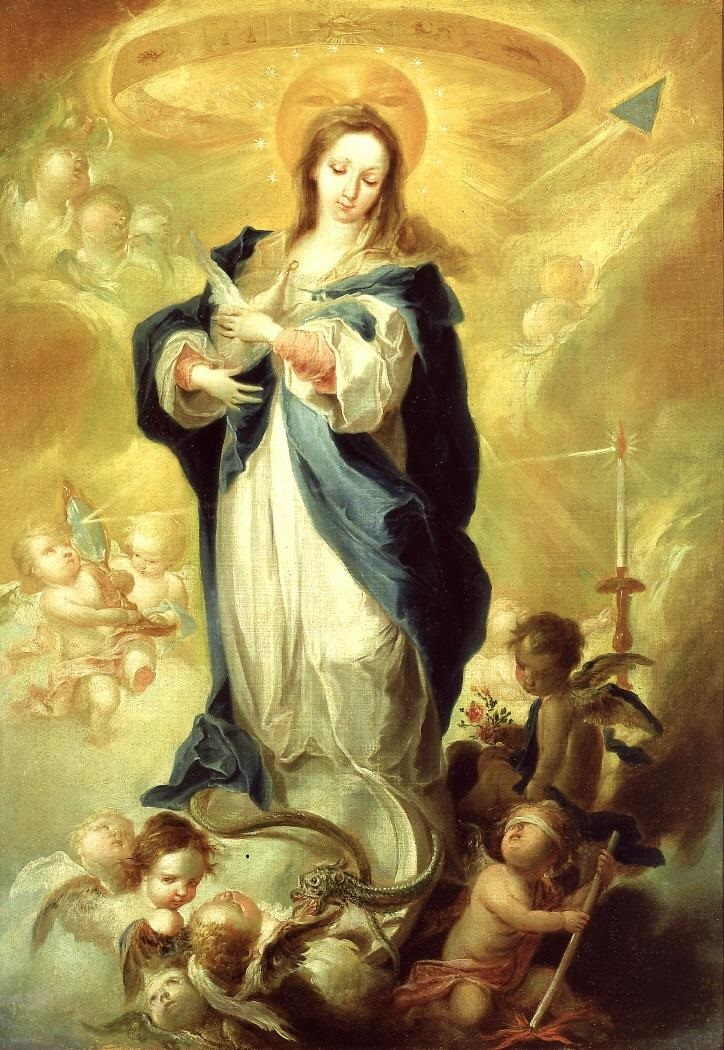
The Immaculate Conception of the Zodiac

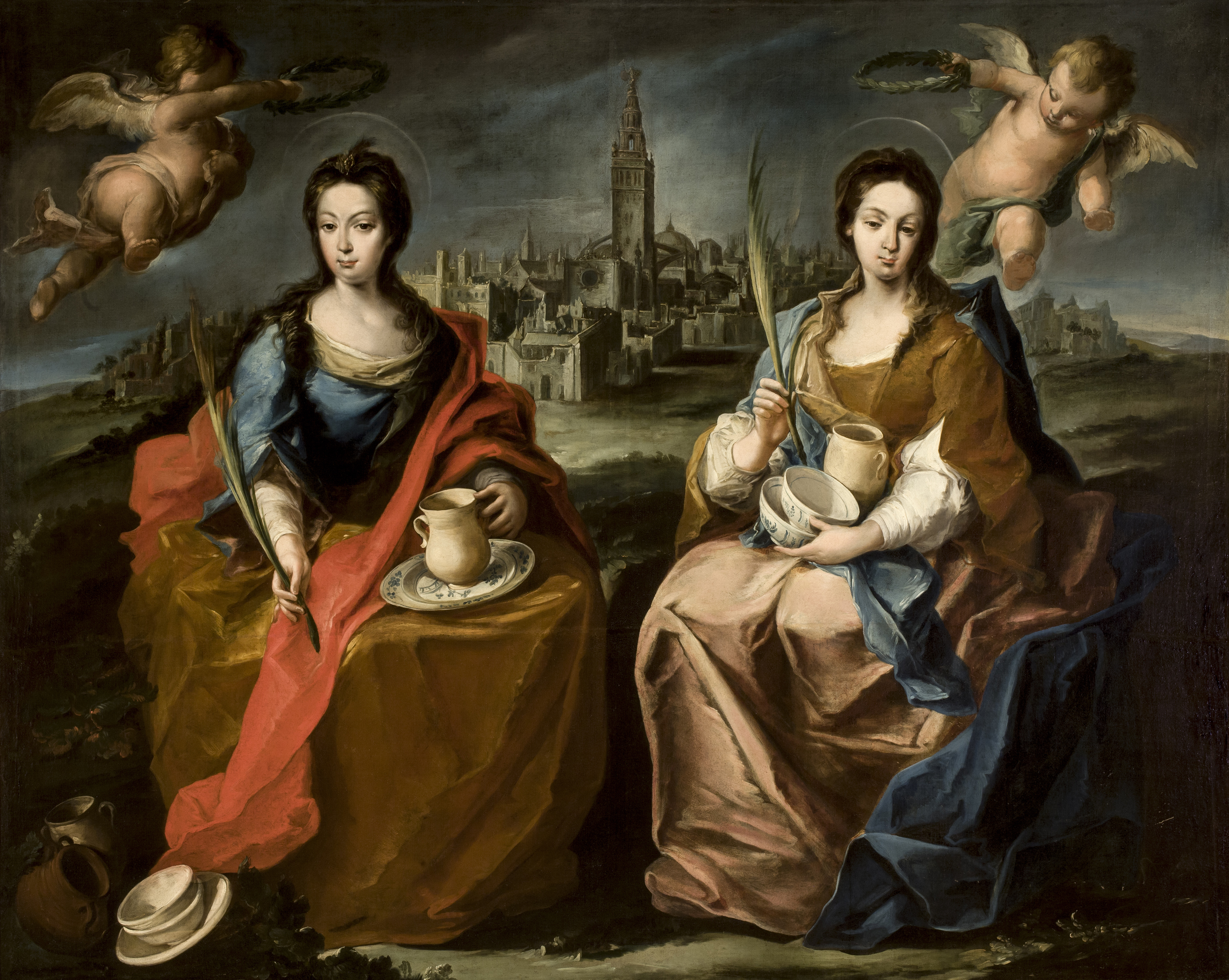
Saints Justa and Rufina

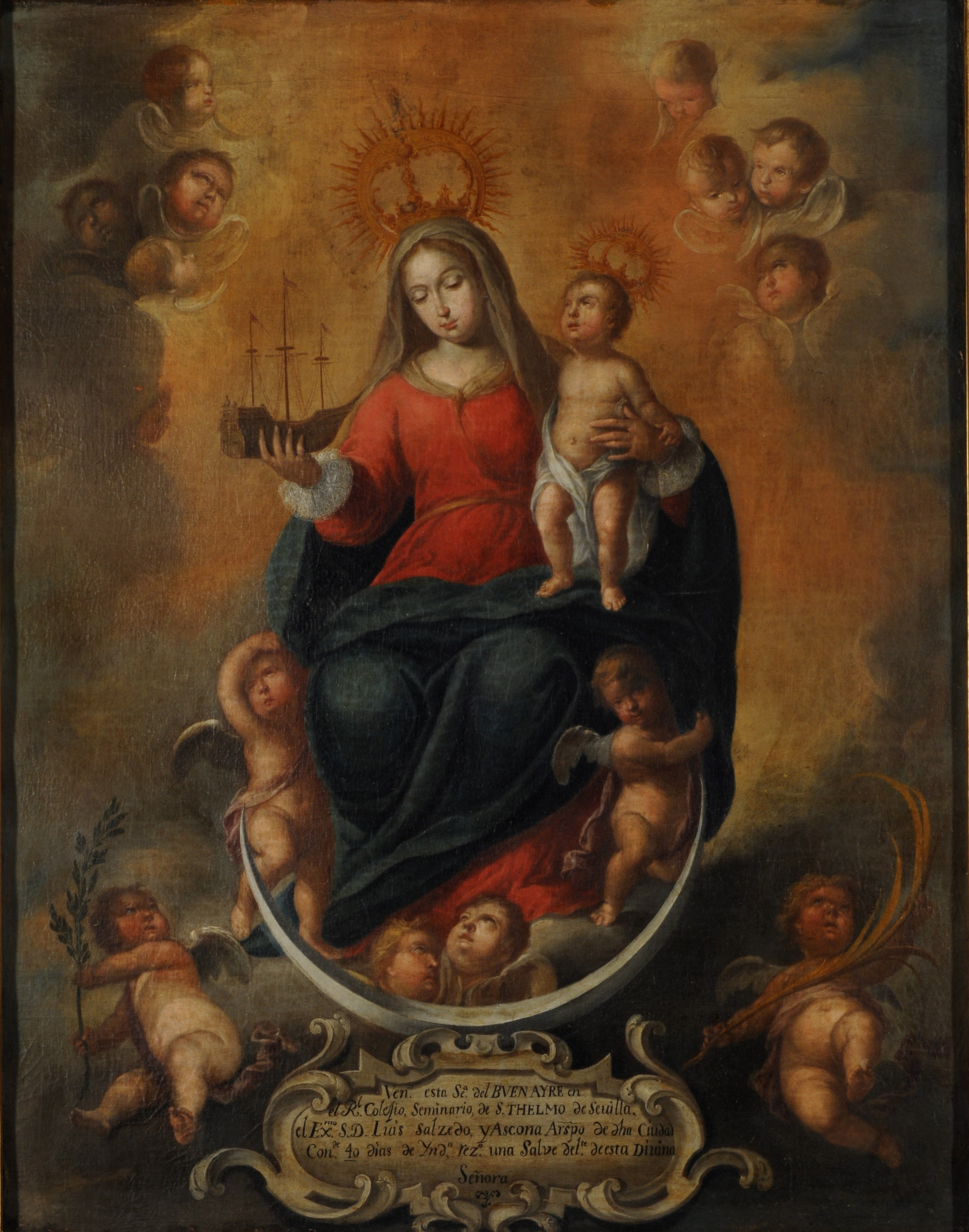
The Virgin of Bonaria
