= José García Ramos =

Spanish painter and illustrator

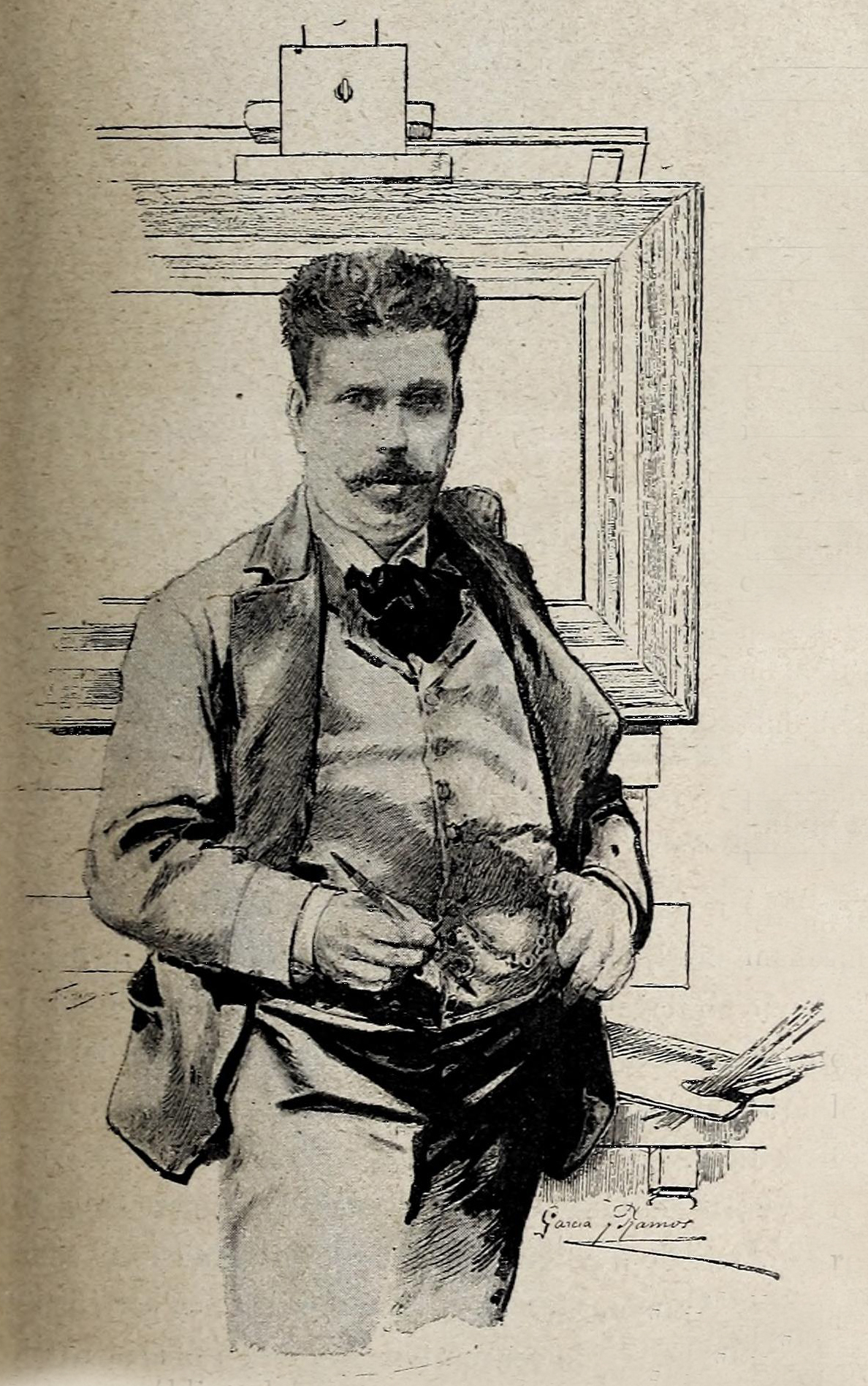
Self-portrait (c. 1894)

José García Ramos (1852, Seville - 2 April 1912, Seville) was a Spanish painter and illustrator; known primarily for his costumbrista scenes.

== Biography ==
He attended the "Escuela Provincial de Bellas Artes de Sevilla" at the age of nine, where he studied with Eduardo Cano, then completed his artistic education in the workshop of José Jiménez Aranda, with whom he travelled to Rome in 1872. There, he earned his living painting small landscapes and portraits of visiting Andalusians, for which he was especially noted. He also became acquainted with Mariano Fortuny, who had a great influence on his style.

In 1877, he visited Naples and Venice and, in 1882, returned to Spain with a brief side trip to Paris. Later, he was named a Professor at the "Escuela de Artes Industriales" and an Academician at the Real Academia de Bellas Artes de Santa Isabel de Hungría. He also worked as an illustrator for several publications; notably La Ilustración Artística, La Ilustración Española y Americana and Blanco y Negro. He won third prize at the Exposition Universelle (1900).

His favorite themes were traditional in nature and he is considered a major exponent of Andalusian regional painting. In 1917, a group of artists proposed erecting a memorial gazebo in the Jardines de Murillo. The government accepted the proposal, it was paid for with funds collected by the artists, and was opened to the public in 1923.

Many of his best known works may be seen at the Carmen Thyssen Museum in Málaga and at the Museo del Prado.

== Selected paintings ==
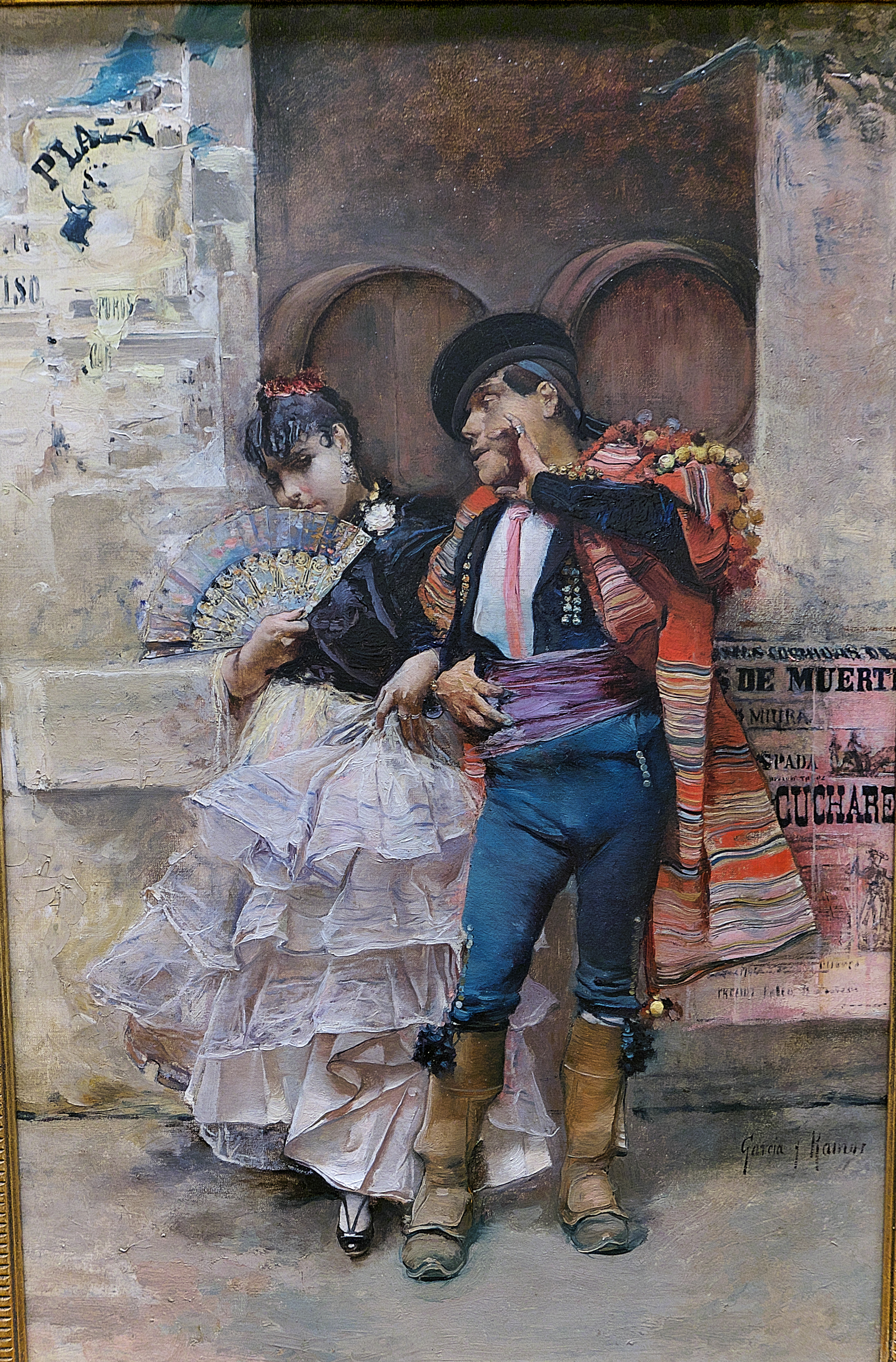
A Pair of Sevillian Dancers

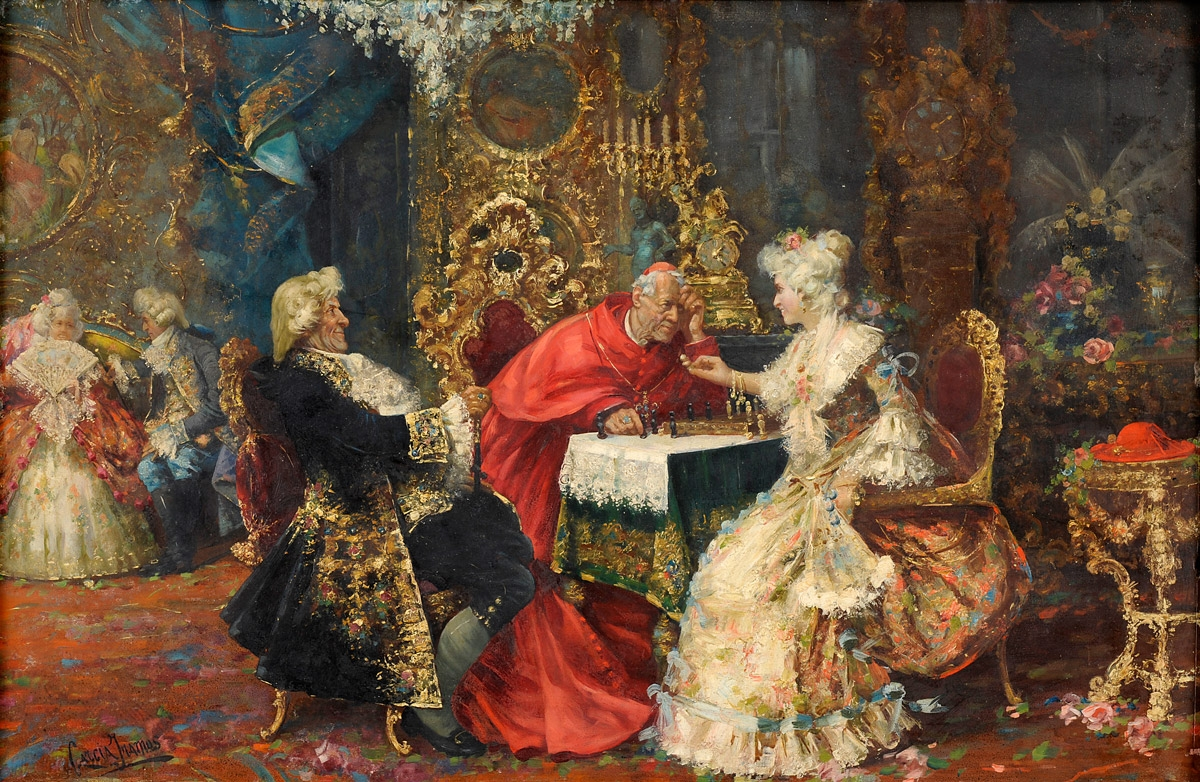
Checkmate

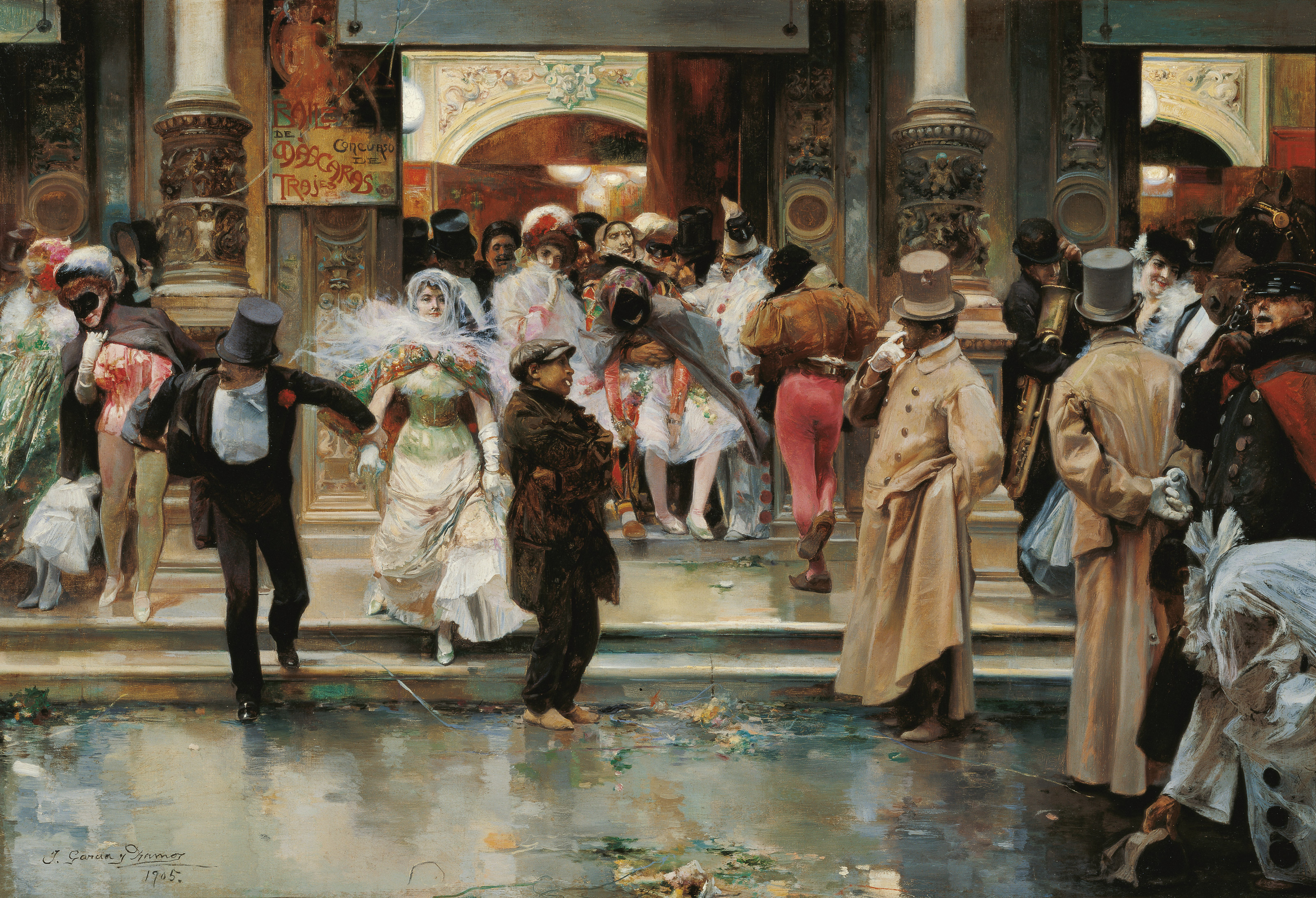
Leaving a Masked Ball

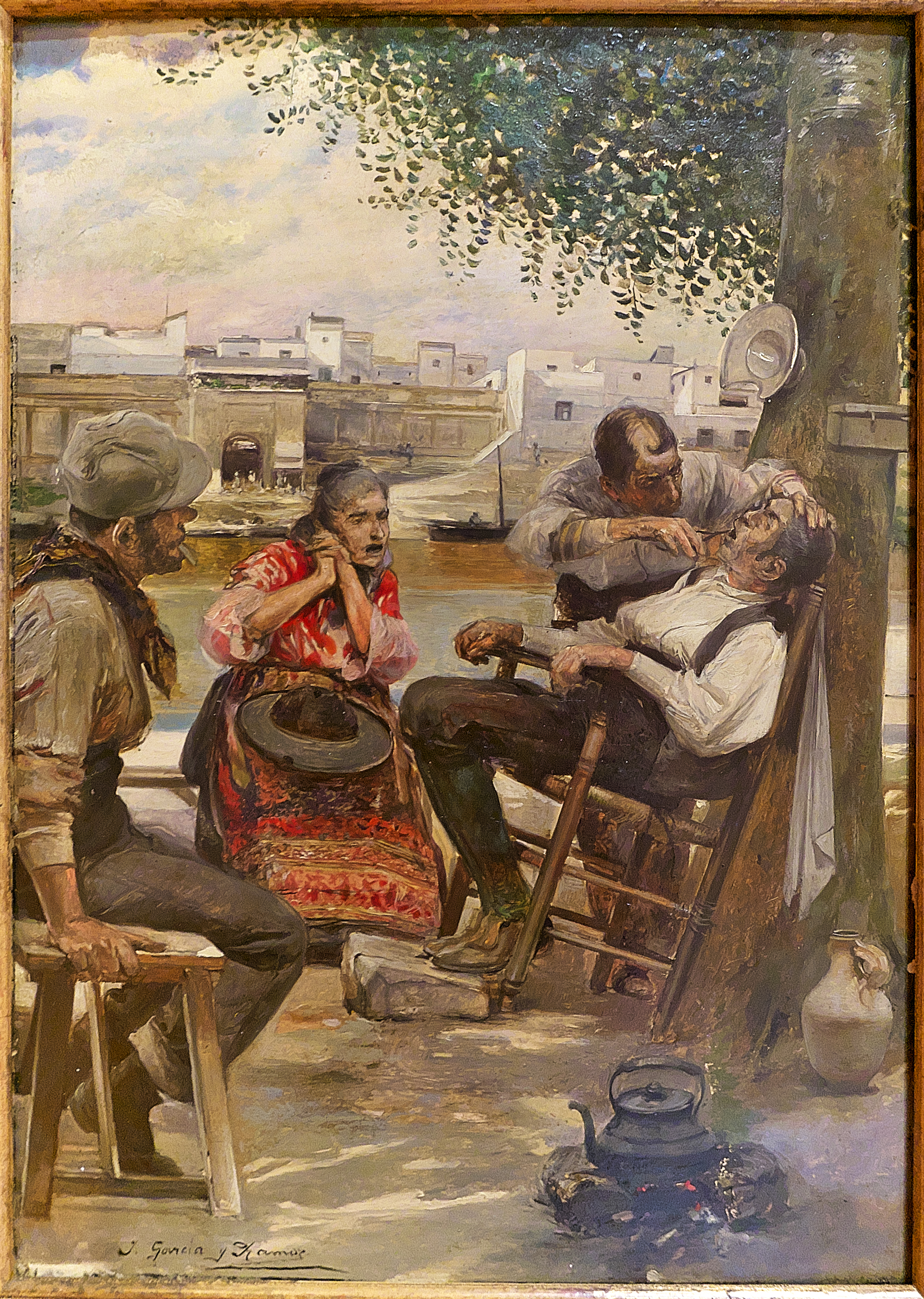
Barber Pulling a Tooth
