= Museum of Fine Arts of Seville =

- Museo de Bellas Artes de Sevilla
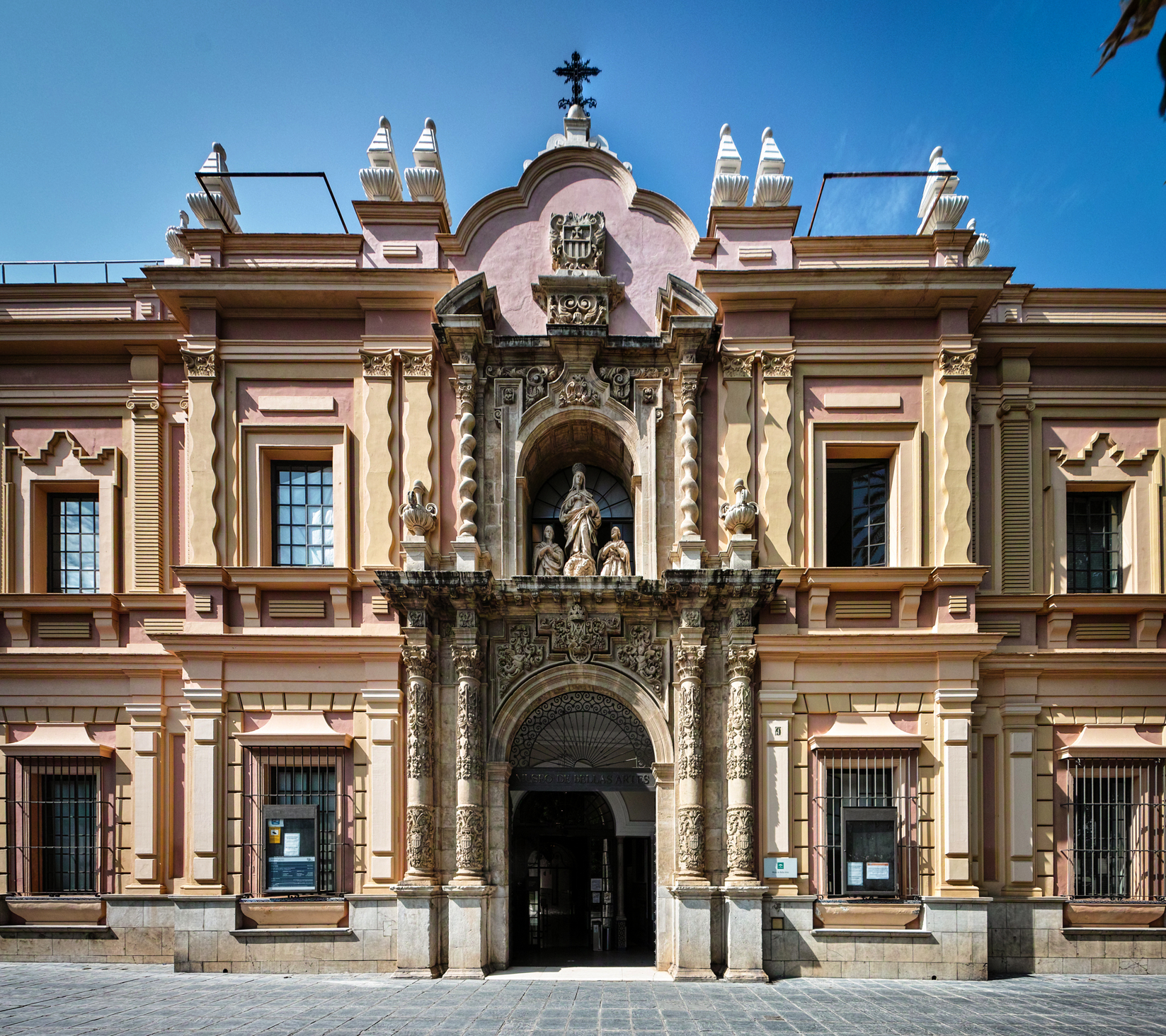
- Façade of the Museum of Fine Arts of Seville
- Established: September 16, 1835
- Location: Plaza del Museo, Seville, Spain
- Coordinates: 37°23′34″N 6°00′00″W
- Type: Art museum
- Owner: General State Administration

The Museum of Fine Arts of Seville (Spanish: Museo de Bellas Artes de Sevilla) is one of the main art galleries in Seville, Spain, with a collection of Spanish visual arts from the medieval period to the early 20th century. The collection includes a choice selection of works by artists from the Golden Age of Sevillian painting during the 17th century, such as Bartolomé Esteban Murillo, Francisco de Zurbarán, and Valdés Leal.

The main entrance faces the Plaza del Museo.

Inside, the museum contains 14 galleries, three cloisters (claustro grande, claustro de los bojes, and claustro del aljibe), and a patio.

== History ==
The building was originally built in 1594 to house the convent of the Order of the Blessed Virgin Mary of Mercy, founded by St. Peter Nolasco during the reign of Ferdinand III. The provincial museum of Seville was established on September 16, 1835 and items were moved to the museum in the ensuing years. Extensive remodeling in the early 17th century was led by the architect Juan de Oviedo y de la Bandera.

In 1941, the Archeological Museum of Seville relocated to the Fine Arts Pavilion of the Ibero-American Exposition of 1929, in the Plaza de América within María Luisa Park, leaving only the Museum of Fine Arts remaining in the building.

== Collection ==
The origins of the collection lie in works originating from secularized convents and monasteries, which is why the bulk of the works consists of religious painting—primarily from the Sevillian Baroque period.

== Painters and sculptors in the museum ==
A - F

- Pedro de Acosta
- Miguel de Adán
- Pieter Aertsen
- Nicolás Alperiz
- Francisco Antolínez
- José Arpa y Perea
- Matías de Arteaga
- Gustavo Bacarisas
- Francisco Barrera
- Manuel Barrón y Carrillo
- Diego Bejarano
- Mariano Benlliure
- Guillaume Benson
- Bartolomé Bermejo
- Gonzalo Bilbao
- Manuel Cabral Aguado-Bejarano
- Alonso Cano
- Eduardo Cano
- Juan José Carpio
- Juan del Castillo
- Pieter Coecke
- Marcelo Cofferman
- Lucas Cranach
- José Domínguez Becquer
- Valeriano Bécquer
- Juan de Espinal
- Antonio María Esquivel
- Frans Francken I
- Rosendo Fernández
- Alejo Fernández

G - M

- José García Ramos
- Guillermo Gómez Gil
- Manuel González Santos
- Francisco de Goya
- Alfonso Grosso
- Francisco Gutiérrez
- Juan Simón Gutiérrez
- José Gutiérrez de la Vega
- Eugenio Hermoso
- Francisco Herrera el Viejo
- Francisco Herrera el Mozo
- Jean Joseph Horemmans el viejo
- Joaquín Bilbao
- José Jiménez Aranda
- José Lafita y Blanco
- Diego López
- Ricardo López Cabrera
- Raimundo de Madrazo y Garreta
- A Martínez Díaz
- Domingo Martínez
- Santiago Martínez
- Juan Martínez Montañés (s)
- Eduardo Martínez Vázquez
- Virgilio Mattoni
- Francisco Meses Osorio
- Lorenzo Mercadante de Bretaña (s)
- Juan de Mesa (s)
- Pedro Millán (s)
- Cristóbal de Morales
- José Moreno Carbonero

M - U

- Bartolomé Esteban Murillo
- Francisco Narbona
- Gaspar Núñez Delgado (s)
- Andrés de Ocampo (s)
- Juan de Oviedo
- Francisco Pacheco
- Andrés Parladé
- Vasco Pereira
- Miguel Ángel del Pino Sardá
- Pieter Pourbus
- José de Ribera
- José Rico Cejudo
- José María Rodríguez-Acosta
- Juan de Roelas
- Jose Marís Romero
- Antonio Ruiz Echagüe
- Giovan Battista Ruoppolo
- Juan Miguel Sánchez
- Emilio Sánchez-Perrier
- Cornelis Schut III
- Vincent Sellaer
- Rafael Senet
- Francisco Soria Aedo
- Juan de Solis
- Doménikos Theotokópoulos, "El Greco"
- Fernando Tirado
- Clemente de Torres
- Pietro Torrigiano (s)
- Juan de Uceda

V-Z

- Andrea Vaccaro
- Valdés Leal
- Lucas Valdés
- Pieter van Lint
- Francisco Varela
- Luis de Vargas
- Alonso Vázquez (painter)
- Diego de Silva y Velázquez
- José Villegas Cordero
- Cornelis de Vos
- Marten de Vos
- Sebastian Vrancx
- Jan Wildens
- Ignacio Zuloaga
- Francisco de Zurbarán

== Collection highlights ==
- Madonna and Child of the Napkin by Bartolomé Esteban Murillo
- Saint Hugh in the Carthusian Refectory by Francisco de Zurbarán
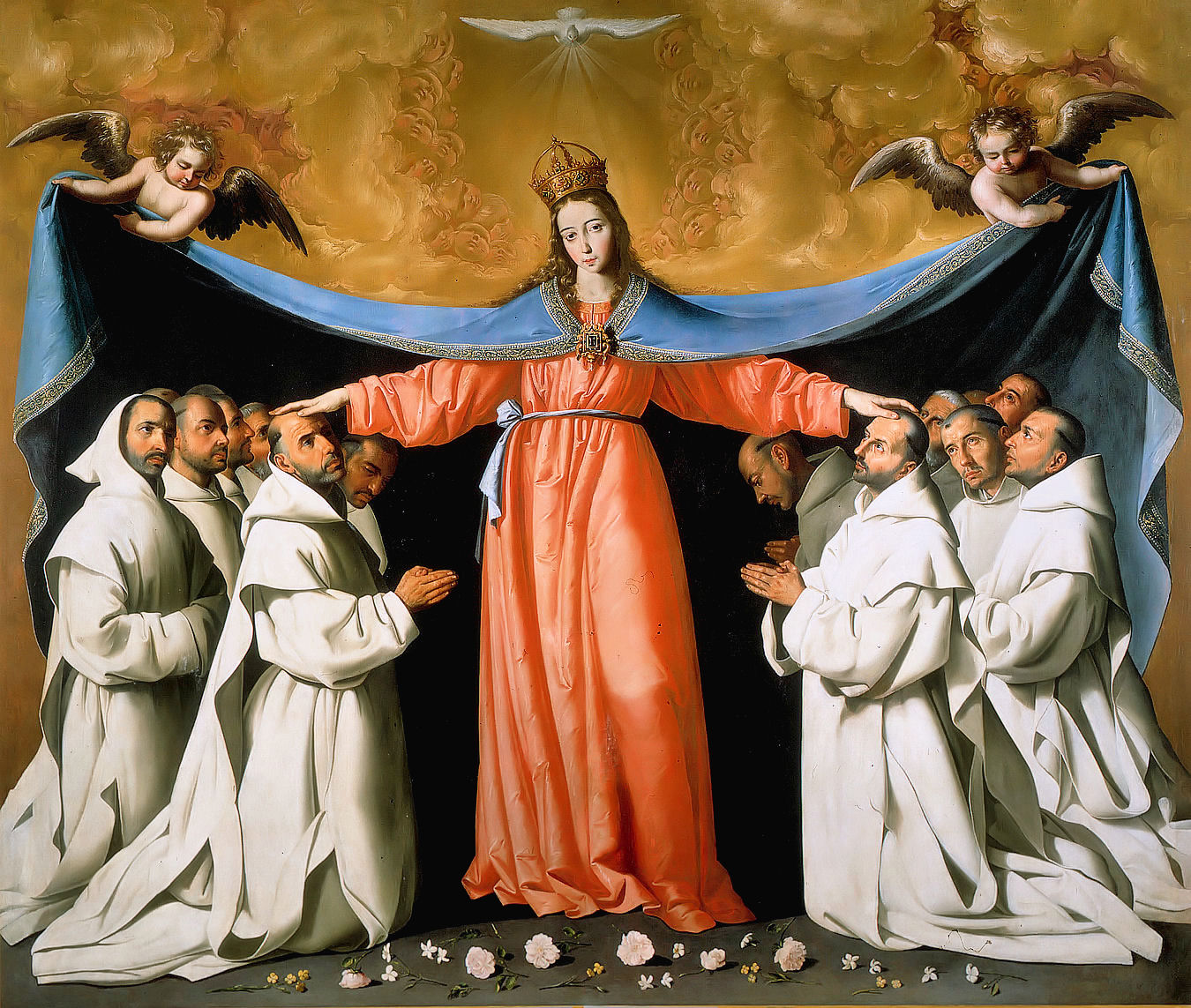
Virgen de las Cuevas by Francisco de Zurbarán
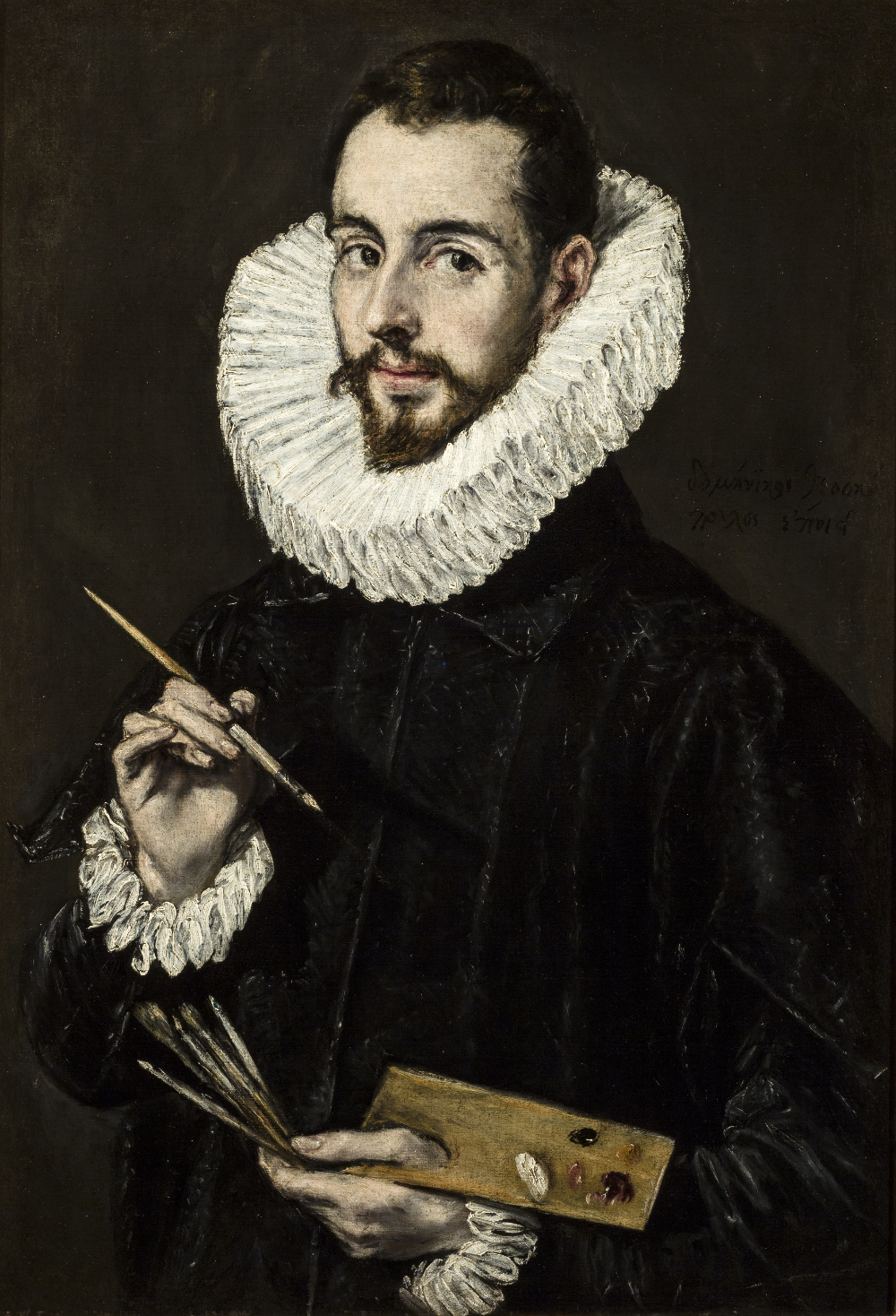
Portrait of Jorge Manuel Theotocópuli by El Greco

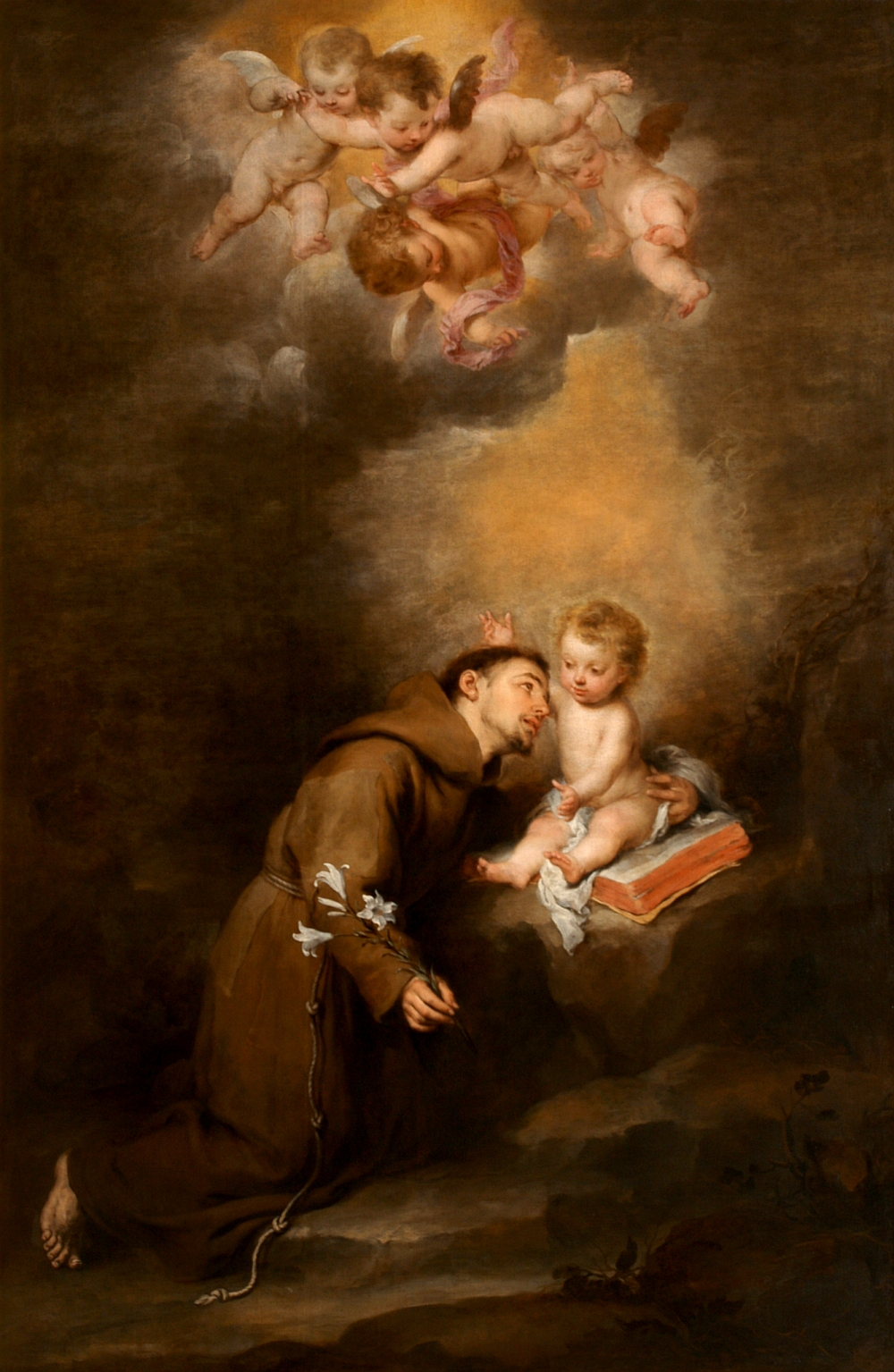
San Antonio de Padua con el Niño by Bartolomé Esteban Murillo

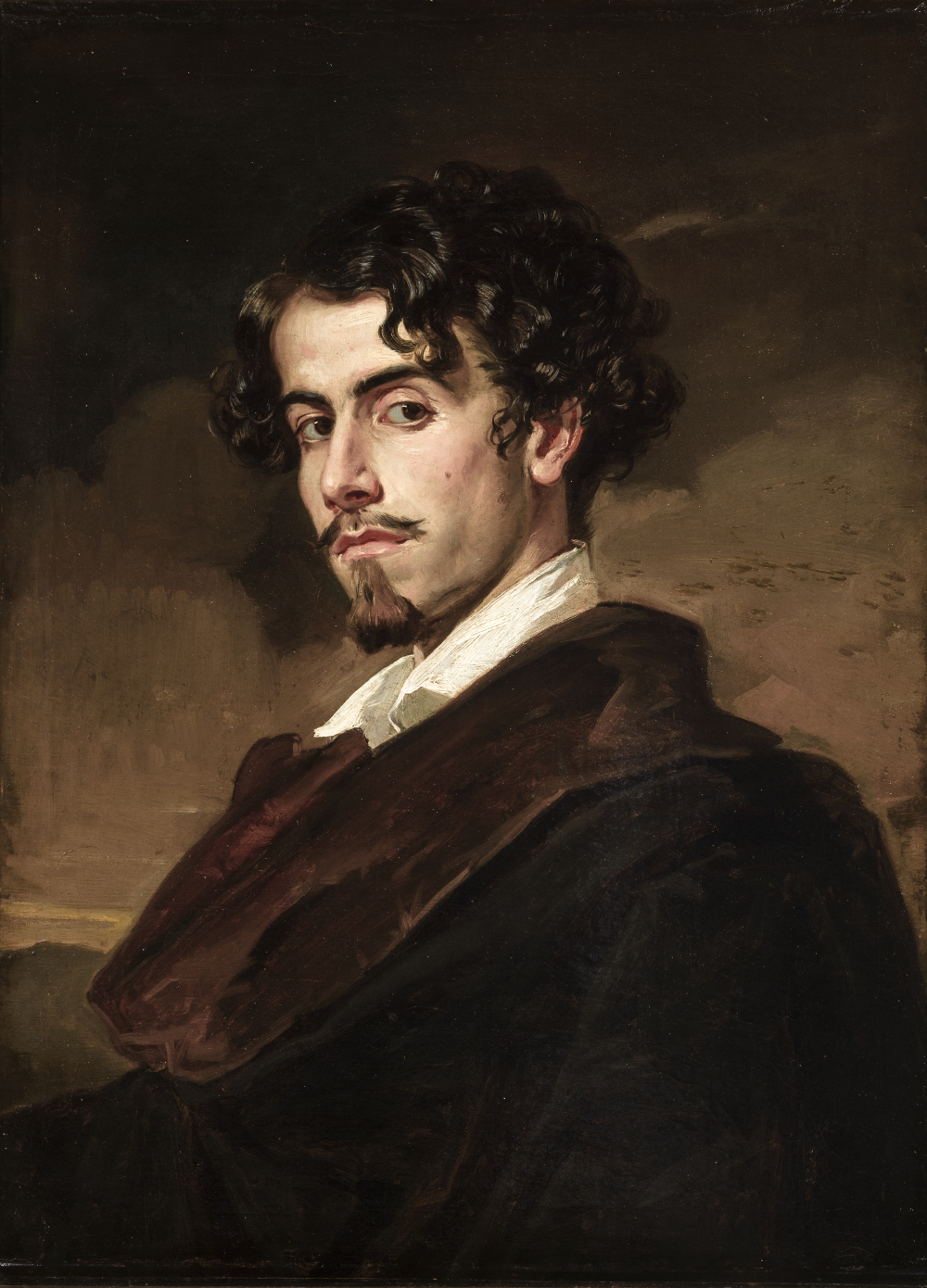
Portrait of Gustavo Adolfo Becquer by Valeriano Becquer
