= Ettore Simonetti =

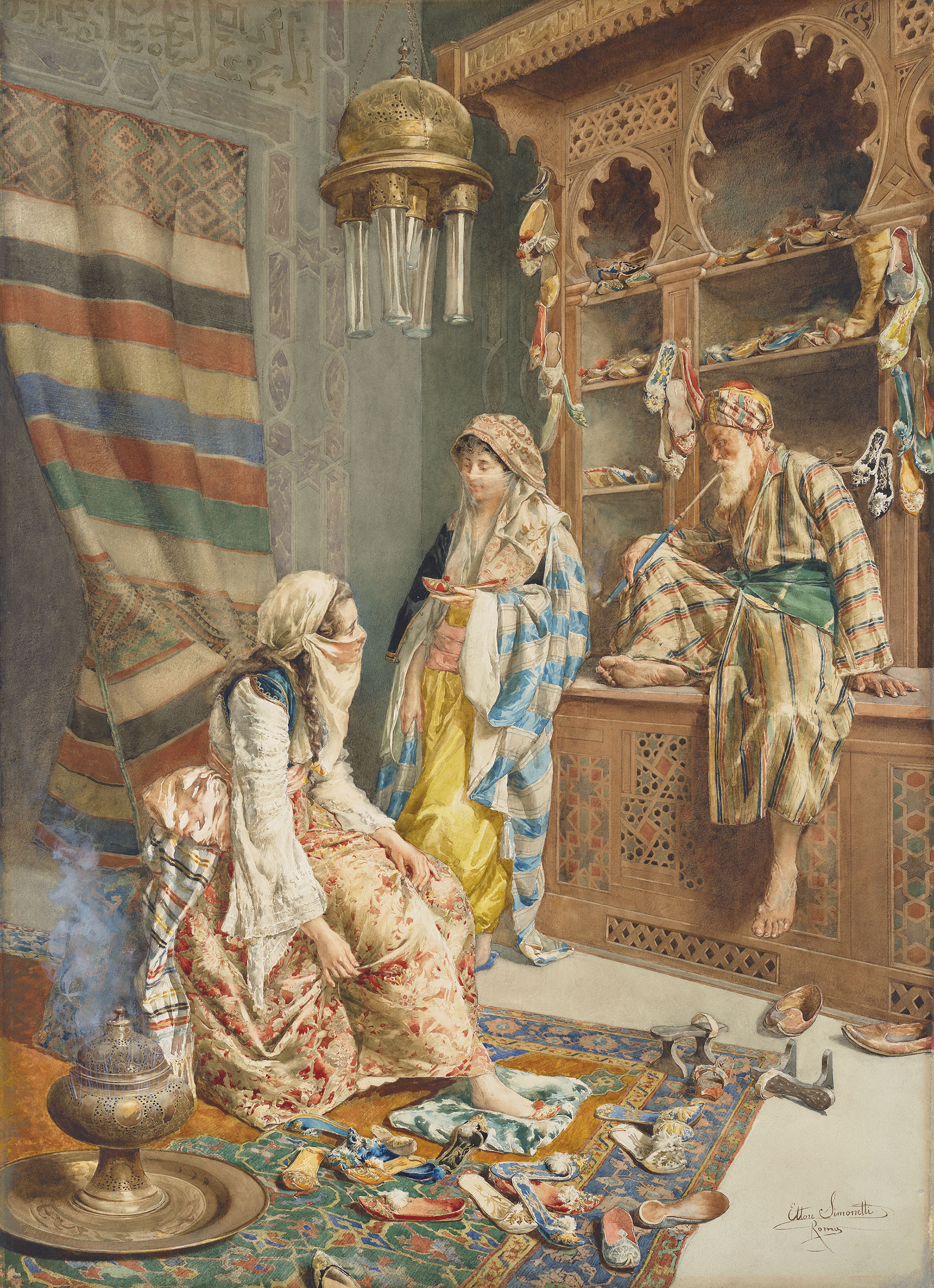
At the Shoe Shop

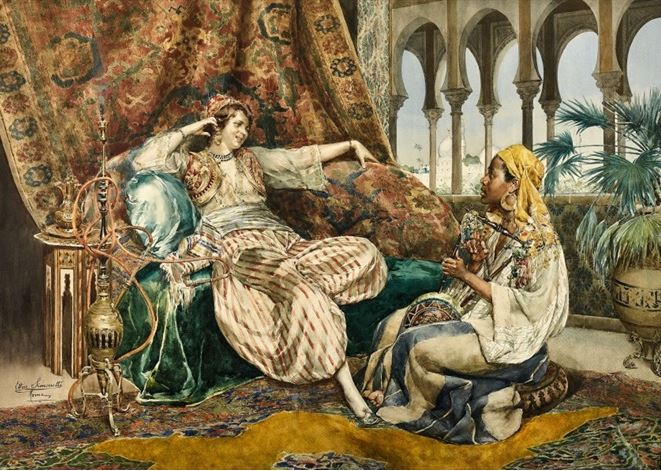
A Serenade in the Palace

Ettore Simonetti (1857, Rome - 1909, Rome) was an Italian painter and watercolorist, who specialized in Orientalist works and historical genre scenes.

== Biography ==
His father, Francesco, was a goldsmith and carver. His mother, Carolina, née Raffaelli, came from a family of mosaic artists, with a workshop in Rome. One of his ancestors, Giacomo Raffaelli, helped to develop the modern micromosaic technique. In 1869, he attended a course on geometry at the Accademia di San Luca, and was awarded a prize for perspective. Ettore was brother of the painter and antique dealer Attilio Simonetti.

He was part of a group of watercolorists that included Enrico Tarenghi, Giuseppe Aureli, and Giulio Rosati. Although it would appear that they never travelled to North Africa or the Middle East, they created Orientalist works, based on photographs, other artists' illustrations, and traveler's descriptions.

Much if his work was heavily influenced by his older brother, Attilio who, in 1875, was one of the cofounders of the Associazione degli Acquarellisti romani. A follower of the Spanish artist, Mariano Fortuny and an organizer of festivals, Attilio had a large collection of carpets, dresses, damask fabrics, silks, slippers, brass, ceramic and copper objects, all original and from the Near East. With these accessories, Ettore was able to reconstruct the scenes for his paintings. Many of his works employed the same figures; rearranged or in different settings.

He also had a passion for the Eighteenth Century, with counts, musketeers, cardinals and ladies in period costumes. His influences, in this case, came from the Baroque painter, Pietro Longhi.

In 1882, he participated in an exhibition of the "Associazione Artistica Internazionale" followed, in 1899, by one at the "Società degli Amatori e Cultori di belle Arti" and, in 1900 at the "Società degli acquarellisti". He occasionally taught at the nude drawing school at the Accademia di Belle Arti di Roma.

His nephew Amedeo, studied with him and also became an Orientalist painter.
