= Barucci =

Barucci is a surname. Notable people with the surname include:

- Maria A. Barucci, Italian astronomer
- Piero Barucci (1933–2026), Italian academic, economist, and politician
- Pietro Barucci (1845–1917), Italian painter
- Pietro Barucci (architect) (1922–2023), Italian architect and urban planner

== See also ==
- Meanings of minor-planet names: 3001–4000#485
