= List of museums in Rome =

List of museums in Rome. The city contains vast quantities of priceless art, sculpture and treasures, which are mainly stored in its many museums. This list of museums divided by category, the main museums:

== National Museums "Musei Nazionali" ==
- Colosseum Archaeological Park • Palatine Hill • Roman Forum
- Circus Maximus
- Baths of Caracalla
- Castel Sant'Angelo
- Ostia Antica Archaeological Park
- National Museum of Rome - A set of four museums in Rome displaying items discovered in Rome

- Baths of Diocletian
- Crypta Balbi
- Palazzo Altemps
- Palazzo Massimo alle Terme

- Galleria Borghese
- National Etruscan Museum
- Galleria Nazionale d'Arte Antica
- Galleria Nazionale d'Arte Moderna
- Galleria Spada
- Mausoleum of Augustus
- Monument to Vittorio Emanuele II
- Museo nazionale del Palazzo di Venezia
- Appian Way Archaeological Park

- Appian Way
- Mausoleum of Cecilia Metella
- Villa of Maxentius
- Capo di Bove
- Tombs of Via Latina
- Villa of the Quintilii
- Villa dei Sette Bassi
- Parco degli Acquedotti

- Pigorini National Museum of Prehistory and Ethnography
- Museo delle civiltà
- National Museum of Oriental Art
- National Museum of Pasta Foods

=== Temporary exhibition space ===
- Scuderie del Quirinale
- Palazzo delle Esposizioni

== Civic Museums "Musei in Comune" ==
These museums are part of the Municipality of Rome Museum System:

=== Archaeology ===
- Ara Pacis
- Capitoline Museums
- Centrale Montemartini
- Museo dei Fori Imperiali
- Domus Aurea
- Museum of Roman Civilization
- Museo Barracco di Scultura Antica
- Museo delle Mura
- Circus of Maxentius (Villa di Massenzio)
- Case Romane del Celio
- Drugstore Museum

=== Modern and contemporary art ===
- Museum of Contemporary Art of Rome (MACRO)
- Galleria Comunale d'Arte Moderna
- Museo di Roma in Trastevere
- Torlonia Museum
- Museo Napoleonico
- Museo Carlo Bilotti
- Museo di Roma
- Museo Pietro Canonica

=== Science ===
- Museo Civico di Zoologia
- Planetarium EUR, Rome

== Vatican museums and churches ==
- Vatican Museums
- Vatican Historical Museum
- Apostolic Palace of Castel Gandolfo
- Pontifical Museum of Christian Antiquities
- Crypt of the Santa Maria della Concezione dei Cappuccini
- Santa Croce in Gerusalemme
- San Giovanni dei Fiorentini
- Archbasilica of Saint John Lateran
- San Lorenzo in Lucina
- San Pancrazio
- Museo della Basilica Patriarcale di Santa Maria Maggiore
- Santa Sabina
- San Crisogono
- Museo della Camera Storica in San Giovanni Battista Decollato
- Santi Vincenzo e Anastasio a Trevi
- Basilica of Saint Paul Outside the Walls
- San Francesco a Ripa

== Art before the nineteenth century ==
- Palazzo di Propaganda Fide
- Porta San Paolo
- Museo del Vicino Oriente
- Museo dell'Alto Medioevo
- Museo dell'Arte Classica
- Museo delle Anime del Purgatorio
- Via Ostiense Museum
- Villa Farnesina

== Modern and contemporary art ==
- MAXXI (National Museum of the 21st century arts)
- Venanzo Crocetti Museum
- Hendrik Christian Andersen Museum
- Palazzo Merulana

== Gallery ==
- Gallery of the Academy of Saint Luke
- Doria Pamphilj Gallery
- Palazzo Colonna
- Galleria dell'Accademia Nazionale di San Luca
- Galleria Pallavicini e Casino dell'Aurora
- Museum of Villa Doria Pamphilj

== History ==
- Museo del Risorgimento
- Museum of the Liberation of Rome
- Museo delle Origini
- Museo della Repubblica Romana e della memoria garibaldina

== Science ==
- Geological Museum Rome
- Enrico Fermi Center
- Museo Leonardo da Vinci
- Museo di Fisica

== Specialized museums ==
- Jewish Museum of Rome
- Museo Atelier Canova Tadolini
- Museo del Corso
- Museum of the Teatro dell'Opera di Roma
- Archivio Museo storico di Fiume
- Antica Spezieria di Santa Maria della Scala
- Artificialia - Museo Wunderkammer
- Banca di Roma - Sala Espositiva dell'Archivio Storico
- Cimitero Acattolico (Non-Catholic Cemetery)
- Cineccittà si Mostra

== Former homes of celebrities ==
- Casa di Goethe
- Giorgio de Chirico House Museum
- Keats-Shelley Memorial House
- Casa di Pirandello
- Museo Tassiano
- Museo Mario Praz
- Casa Museo Alberto Moravia

== See also ==
- List of museums in Italy
- Tourism in Rome
- List of tourist attractions in Rome
