= Amedeo Simonetti =

Italian painter (1874–1922)

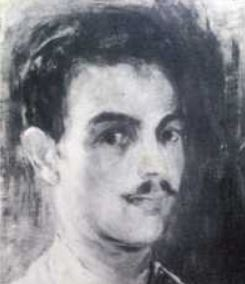
Self-portrait (date unknown)

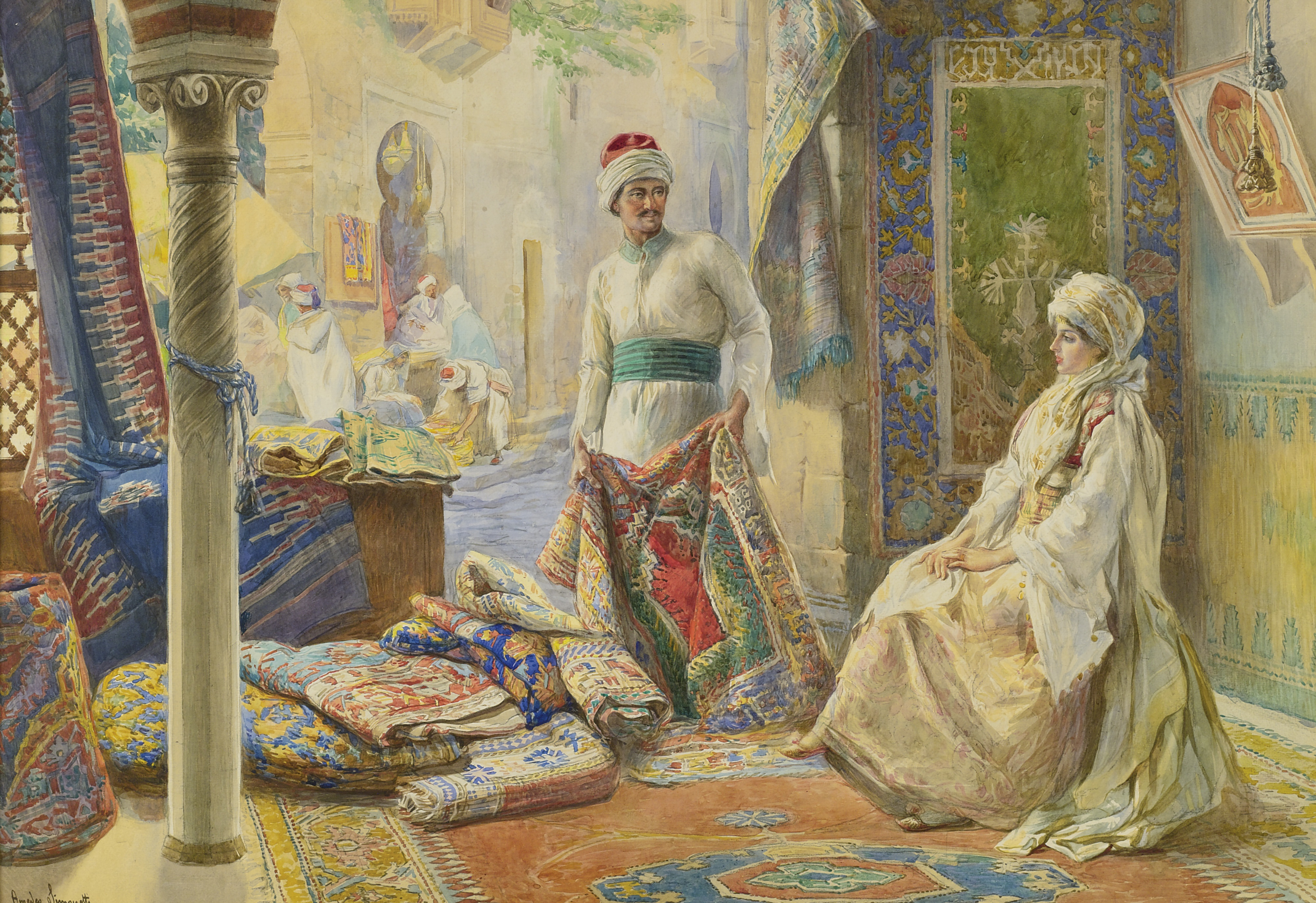
The Rug Merchant

Amedeo Simonetti (8 April 1874 – 22 April 1922) was an Italian painter known primarily for his Orientalist scenes. He was sometimes referred to by his childhood nickname, Momo.

== Biography ==
He was born in Genoa. He came to the career of artist late, and was first inspired by the example of his uncles, Ettore, an Orientalist painter, and Attilio, a former associate of the Spanish artist Mariano Fortuny.

After taking some introductory art lessons from Ettore, he studied at the Accademia di Belle Arti di Roma with Giovanni Costantini, known as "Il Grillo" (the cricket), who specialized in historical and genre scenes.

He began by painting the countryside in the vicinity of Prati, a rapidly urbanizing area where the natural scenery was disappearing. Under the influence of his uncle and Costantini, he also produced Orientalist scenes and genre works depicting 18th century figures (courtiers, musketeers and church officials), in lavish settings.

He participated in numerous exhibitions sponsored by the Associazione degli Acquarellisti romani (watercolorists). He also had major showings at the Venice Biennale, in 1904 and 1908, and at the Milan International in 1906.

In 1919, by invitation of Onorato Carlandi, he joined an artists' society known as the "XXV della campagna romana", devoted to the free pursuit of artistic expression, and much informal socializing. Later, he brought his son, Virgilio into the organization.

Simonetti died on 22 April 1922 in Rome.

== Sources ==
- Aurelio Tommaso Prete, I Simonetti: Amedeo, Accademia internazionale per l'unità della cultura, 1985
- Cecilia Pericoli Ridolfini (ed.), Roma e la campagna romana nella pittura di Amedeo e Virgilio Simonetti, Fondazione Lemmermann, 1986
- Renato Mammucari, La campagna romana: immagini dal passato, Newton Compton, 1991
- Amedeo Simonetti, La Roma dei Simonetti: vedute della Capitale tra '800 e '900, Cromosema, 1999
- Renato Mammucari, "Se non è l'inizio è la fine a dar voce al coro", in: Strenna dei Romanisti, 2006
