= Onorato Carlandi =

Italian painter (1848–1939)

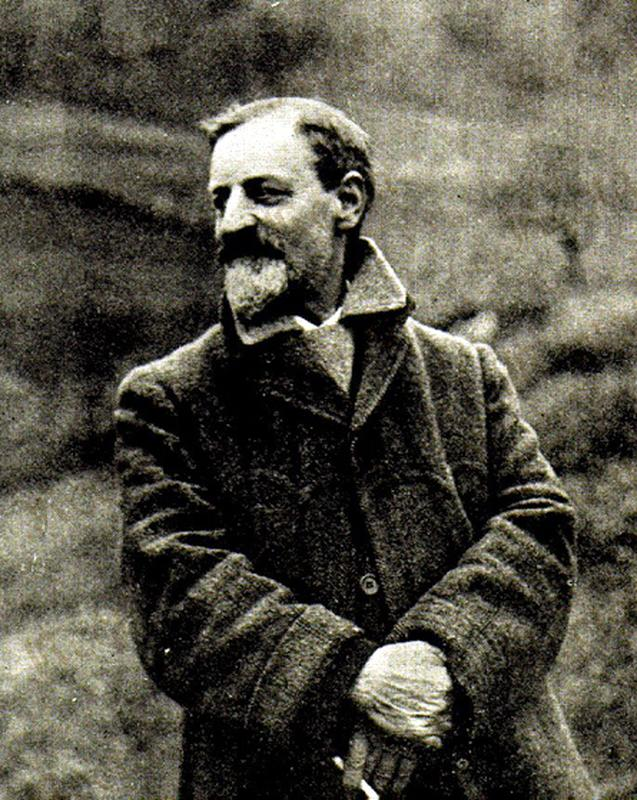
Onorato Carlandi (1922)

Onorato Carlandi (15 May 1848, in Rome – 11 April 1939, in Rome) was an Italian painter, mainly of watercolors of Rome, the surrounding countryside and of Great Britain. He was married to the painter, Lina Haverty (?-1950), daughter of the Irish historian and journalist, Martin Haverty.

== Biography ==
His grandfather was Fortunato Pio Castellani, founder of the eponymous jewelry company. He was originally destined for a career as a lawyer, but went against his family's wishes and enrolled at the Accademia di belle arti di Roma.

At eighteen, he briefly served as a volunteer with the Cacciatori delle Alpi of Giuseppe Garibaldi. After completing his education at the Accademia, he moved to Naples to continue his training. When he returned to Rome, in 1871, he exhibited some paintings that had been inspired by the Risorgimento; depicting the Fratelli Cairoli (five brothers who helped to liberate Rome) and soldiers returning from the Battle of Mentana.

In 1875, he was one of the co-founders of the Società degli Acquerellisti romani (watercolorists), together with Ettore Roesler Franz, Pio Joris and Cesare Biseo.

In 1880, he went to England, to study the English landscape artists. He lived in London until 1891, and became married to Selina Haverty; daughter of an Irish historian. When he returned to Rome, he participated in the activities of the artists' association, "In arte libertas". When this group dissolved, he and several others created "XXV della campagna romana", a society devoted to plein aire painting and informal socializing. While there, he made friends with the Tuscan artist, Cesare Bertolla, and they made numerous trips to paint in the marshes of the Maccarese. In 1908, he was initiated into the Masonic Lodge, "Rienzi".

His works may be seen at the Galleria Nazionale d'Arte Moderna, Galleria Comunale d'Arte Moderna, the gallery of the Accademia di San Luca, the Museo di Roma and the Turin Civic Gallery of Modern and Contemporary Art.

== Selected paintings ==
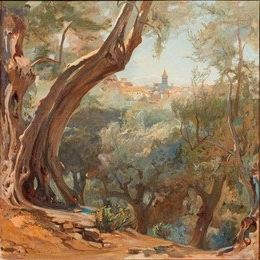
View of Tivoli

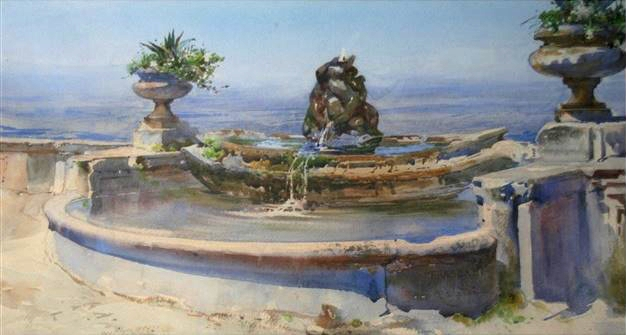
Fountain in Frascati

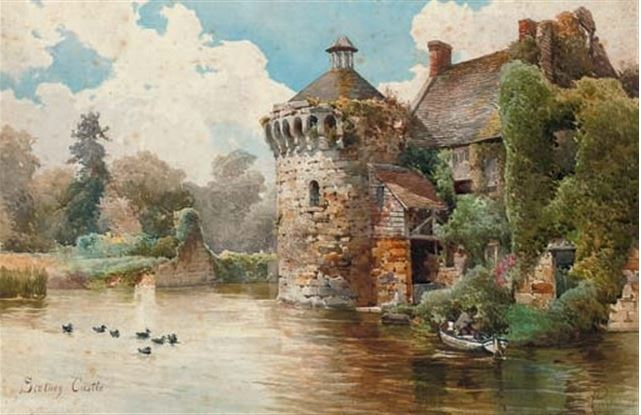
Scotney Castle, Kent

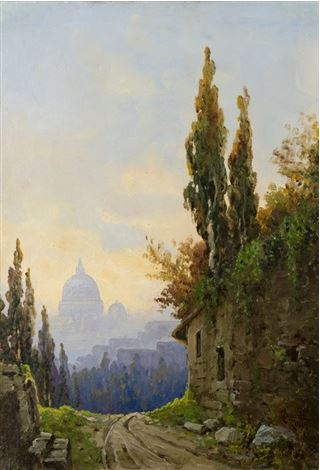
View of Rome, with St. Peter's
