= Sagliano =

Sagliano may refer to:

- Sagliano Micca, a comune in the Province of Biella in the Italian region Piedmont
- Sagliano Crenna, a settlement in Varzi, Italy
- Francesco Sagliano, an Italian painter
