= Nazzareno Cipriani =

Italian painter and watercolorist

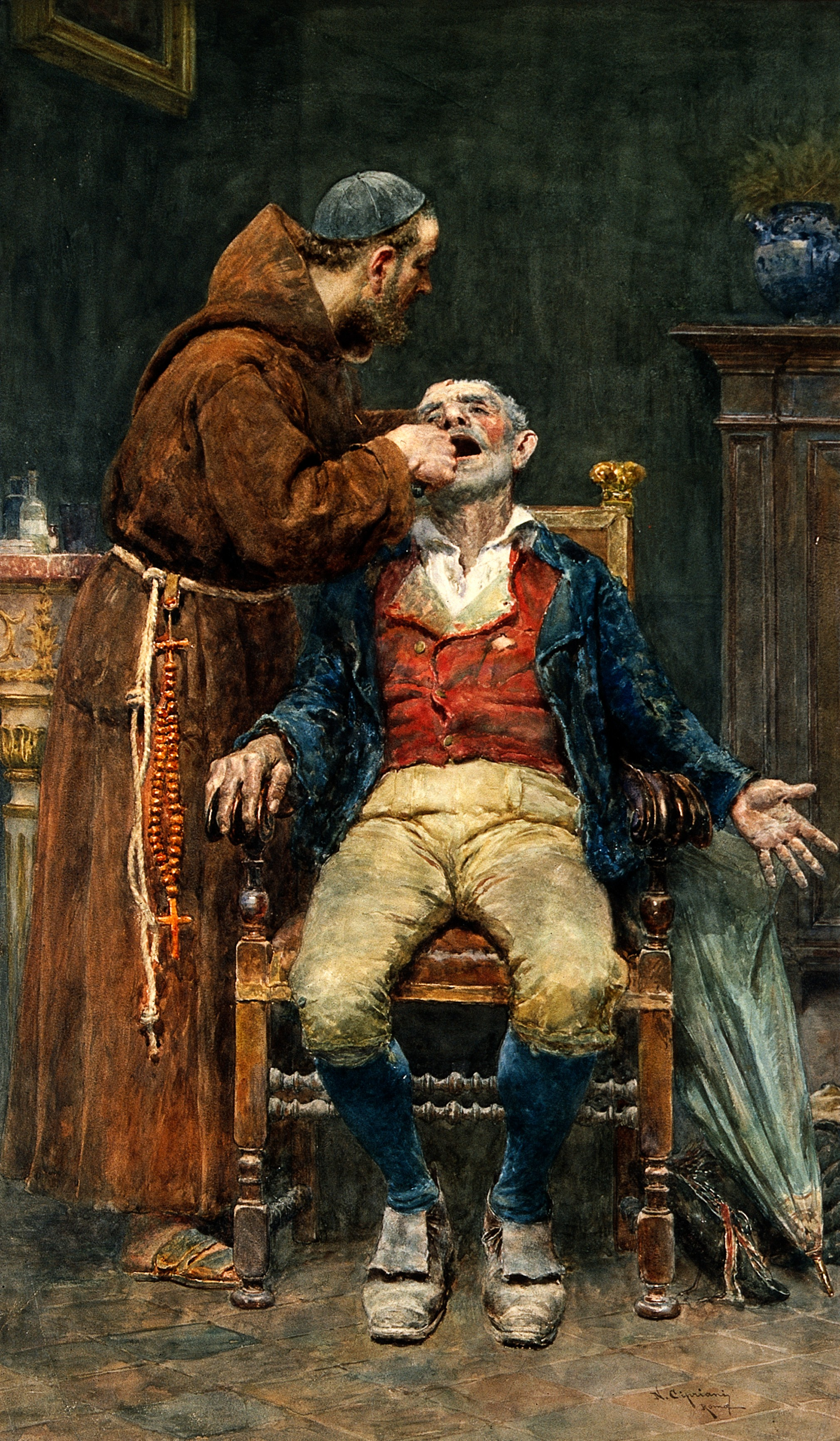
A Friar Extracting a Tooth, watercolor on paper

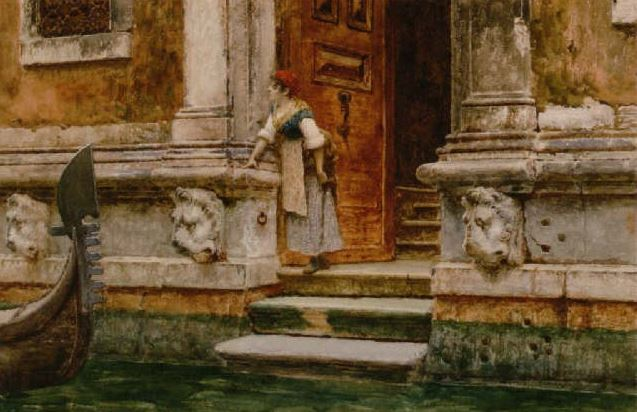
He is Coming!

Nazzareno Cipriani (23 October 1843 – 1925) was an Italian painter and watercolorist known for his views of Venice and his genre scenes.

== Biography ==
Born in Rome, he was descended from a Venetian family. During his studies, he served an apprenticeship in the workshops of the Neapolitan painter, Achille Vertunni, alongside Pietro Barucci and Pio Joris. After three years, he began an independent career, focusing on historical and Biblical subjects.

He first gained popularity when he made his formal debut with Venetian and Roman landscapes, and genre scenes; very traditional in style and rendered in great detail. In 1870, he exhibited with the "Società degli Amatori e Cultori di Belle Arti" then, in 1873, he presented his depiction of a chicken market at the Vienna World's Fair. During this time, he was influenced by the works of Marià Fortuny and made his color scheme more complex. He also began painting with tempera and watercolors.

This was also a time when Orientalist works were very popular, so he made several trips to North Africa, creating sketches for inspiration. He also opened a studio on the Via Margutta, next door to the Orientalist, Enrico Tarenghi.

In 1875, he was one of the ten founders of the Associazione degli Acquarellisti romani (Association of Watercolorists), and participated in their exhibitions until 1913. He also had a showing at the Exposition Universelle (1878). In 1901 and 1902, he exhibited with the progressive artists' group, In arte libertas. He was also a member of the Accademia di San Luca. For most of his life, he gave private lessons.

He died in 1925 in Rome. Many of his work may be seen at the Galleria Nazionale d'Arte Moderna e Contemporanea.

== Sources ==
- Gian Francesco Lomonaco, Acquerelli dell'Ottocento, La Società degli Acquarellisti a Roma, Roma, Fratelli Palombi, 1987 ISBN 88-7621-453-4
- Renato Mammucari, Acquerellisti romani: suggestioni neoclassiche, esotismo orientale, decadentismo bizantino, realismo borghese, Città di Castello (Perugia), Edimond, 2001 ISBN 88-500-0142-8
