= Bonolis =

Bonolis is an Italian surname. Notable people with the name include:

- Giuseppe Bonolis (1800–1851), Italian painter
- Paolo Bonolis (born 1961), Italian television presenter

== See also ==
- Stadio Gaetano Bonolis, multi-use stadium in Teramo, Italy
