= Siegfried Hansen (photographer) =

German street photographer (born 1961)

Siegfried Hansen (born 1961) is a German street photographer known for his work in Hamburg. He was a member of the In-Public street photography collective.

Hansen has produced the books Hold the Line (2015) and Schlagermove (2017), and his work is included in a number of survey publications on street photography. His work has been shown in solo exhibitions in Germany and in group exhibitions at Deichtorhallen in Hamburg and at Museo di Roma in Trastevere in Rome.

== Life ==
Hansen was born in 1961 in Meldorf, Germany. He lives and works in Hamburg, Germany.

== Work ==
Hansen began as a street photographer in 2002 and joined the In-Public street photography collective in 2014. His work has been included in Fotoforum; Photographie; LFI, Leica Fotografie International; Professional Photographer and Fotocommunity Plus.

Jim Casper of LensCulture wrote that "every single image in the book is a gem." Michael Ernest Sweet, writing in HuffPost in 2017, listed Hansen as one of the 12 best contemporary street photographers in the world.

In 2017, Hansen appeared as a guest photographer in an episode of Master of Photography, a TV series reality show.

== Exhibitions ==
=== Solo exhibitions ===
- Der erwartete Zufall, Galerie Kunst-Nah, Hamburg, Germany, 2012.
- Hold The Line, Freelens Galerie, Hamburg, Germany, 2015.
- Streetphotography - Hold The Line, Palais für aktuelle Kunst, Glückstadt, Germany, 2016.

=== Group exhibitions ===
- Street Photography Now, Third Floor Gallery, Cardiff, October–November 2010, and toured to Contributed Studio for the Arts, Berlin, December 2010 – January 2011; Museum of Printing, Historical Museum of Warsaw, Warsaw, November 2011 – January 2012. Photographs from the book Street Photography Now (2011).
- Fascination Street, as a member of the group Seconds2Real, Berlin, Galerie Meinblau, 2011.
- From Distant Street, Contemporary International Street Photography, Galerie Hertz, Louisville, USA, 2011.
- Street Photography Now, Warsaw, 2011. One of forty participants.
- Fascination Street, as a member of the group Seconds2Real, Galerie Anzensberger, Vienna, 2012.
- The Sharp Eye. In-Public in Mexico, Foto Mexico, Cine Tonalá, Mexico City, Mexico, October–November 2015. Slideshow of photographs by various In-Public members. Curated by Mark Powell, Carlos Álvarez Montero and Alfredo Esparza.
- Miami Street Photography Festival, Art Basel Miami Beach, 2013.
- "Via!" – Fotografia di Strada da Amburgo a Palermo, = Street Photography from Hamburg to Palermo, Museo di Roma in Trastevere, Rome, Italy, January 2015 – April 2016
- [Space] Street. Life. Photography: Seven Decades of Street Photography, Deichtorhallen, during the Triennial of Photography, Hamburg, Germany, June–October 2018. 350 works from 50 photographers.
- [Space] Street. Life. Photography: Seven Decades of Street Photography, KunstHausWien, Vienna, Austria, September 2019 – February 2020. 200 works from 35 photographers.
- Observations 2022, Städtische Galerie Iserlohn, Iserlohn, Germany. June 2022. Exhibited alongside work by Enrico Markus Essl, Fabian Schreyer, Gabi Ben-Avraham, Johan Jehlbo, Julie Hrudova, Pierre Belhassen, Stuart Paton and Tavepong Pratoomwong.

== Publications ==
=== Publications by Hansen ===
- Hold the Line. Dortmund: Kettler, 2015. ISBN 978-3-86206-435-9. (Note: The book is profiled by Josef Chladek here.)
- Schlagermove. Enfants Eigenverlag, 2017.
- THE FLOW OF LINES Eyeshot -publisher, 2020. (Note: The book is with 150 Photos by Siegfried Hansen .)

=== Publications with contributions by Hansen ===
- Publication #1. London: Nick Turpin, 2009. Essays by Hin Chua, David Gibson, Michael David Murphy and Turpin. Includes a chapter on Hansen.
- Street Photography Now. London: Thames and Hudson, 2010. ISBN 978-0-500-54393-1. Includes a chapter on Hansen.
- Grossartige Fotografen und ihre Leidenschaften. Addison- Wesley Verlag, Munich 2015, ISBN 978-3-8273-2902-8. Includes a chapter on Hansen.
- Who's Who in Visual Art. Art Domain Whois, 2015. ISBN 978-3-98134-748-7. Includes a chapter on Hansen.
- Fifty Path to Creative Photography. (Michael Freemann) London: Octopus, 2016. ISBN 978-1-78157-347-1. Contains a commentary on and a photograph by Hansen.
- World Street Photography 3. Hamburg: Gudberg, 2016. ISBN 978-3-945772-21-8. Includes a chapter on Hansen.
- 100 Great Street Photographs. London: Prestel, 2017. By David Gibson. ISBN 978-3-7913-8313-2. Contains a commentary on and a photograph by Hansen.
  - Streetphotography. Die 100 besten Bilder. Munich: Prestel, 2017. ISBN 978-3-79138-335-4.
- 50 Wege zur kreativen Fotografie. Frechen: mitp, 2017. ISBN 978-3-95845-458-3. Contains a commentary on and a photograph by Hansen.
- World Street Photography 5. Hamburg: Gudberg, 2018. ISBN 978-3-945772-42-3. Includes a chapter on Hansen.
- Breaking Point - publisher:Hartmann Books, 2018. ISBN 978-3-960700-20-3. Includes a chapter on Hansen.
- Streetfotografie. Der Atem der Straße. Munich: Franzis, 2018. ISBN 978-3-86206-435-9. Text by Andreas Pacek. Includes a chapter on Hansen.
- Street. Life. Photography: Street Photography aus sieben Jahrzehnten: Seven decades of street photography. Heidelberg: Kehrer, 2018. ISBN 978-3-86828-852-0. Includes a chapter on Hansen. Published in conjunction with an exhibition at Deichtorhallen.
- Streetfotografie made in Germany. Bonn: Rheinwerk, 2018. ISBN 978-3-8362-6117-3. Includes a chapter on Hansen.
- Street Photography: A History In 100 Iconic Images. London: Prestel, 2019. By David Gibson. ISBN 978-3-7913-8488-7. Includes a chapter on Hansen.
