= Giuseppe Aureli =

Italian painter (1858–1929)

- Born: 5 December 1858; Rome
- Died: 9 August 1929 (aged 70); Anzio
- Education: Academia de San Luca
- Known for: painting, watercolours
- Movement: Orientalist themes; portraiture

Giuseppe Aureli (December 5, 1858 – 9 August 1929) was an Italian painter and watercolourist. His work is noted for its historical subject matter, portraits of Italian noble families as well as genre paintings and local scenes, especially work with Oriental themes.

== Life and work ==
Giuseppe Aureli was born in Rome in 1858. He received his early art education at the Accademia di San Luca where he was the pupil of Pietro Gabrini and Cesare Maccari. He exhibited in various exhibitions; including: The International Exhibition of 1888 in Munich and the World's Columbian Exposition of 1893 in Chicago, but his Oriental works were rarely included in these early exhibitions.

Having his workshop at 48 Via Margutta in Rome, Aureli was in a position to exchange ideas with the most prolific Orientalist artists at that the time. He used the same staircase that led to a rabbit-warren of studios including those of Filippo Bartolini (1861-1908), Enrico Tarenghi, Nazzareno Cipriani, all considered to be among Rome's master Orientalists, and the illustrator, Ettore Ximenes. With those influences, Aureli began painting more works with Oriental subject matter such as harem scenes and exotic beauties. He died in 1929 in Anzio.

Although Aureli derives his reputation primarily from his paintings of historic Italy and portraits of the Italian Royal family, his work features many representations of Oriental scenes including: harems, guards, Arabic bazaars and street life. His Oriental work typically includes elements such as exotic musical instruments, leopard skin, Moroccan ceramics and greenhouse plants. He worked in watercolours and oils.

Examples of his work can be found in the Galleria Nazionale d'Arte Moderna and L'Aula del Consiglio Provinciale de Rome and in private collections.

== Selected paintings ==
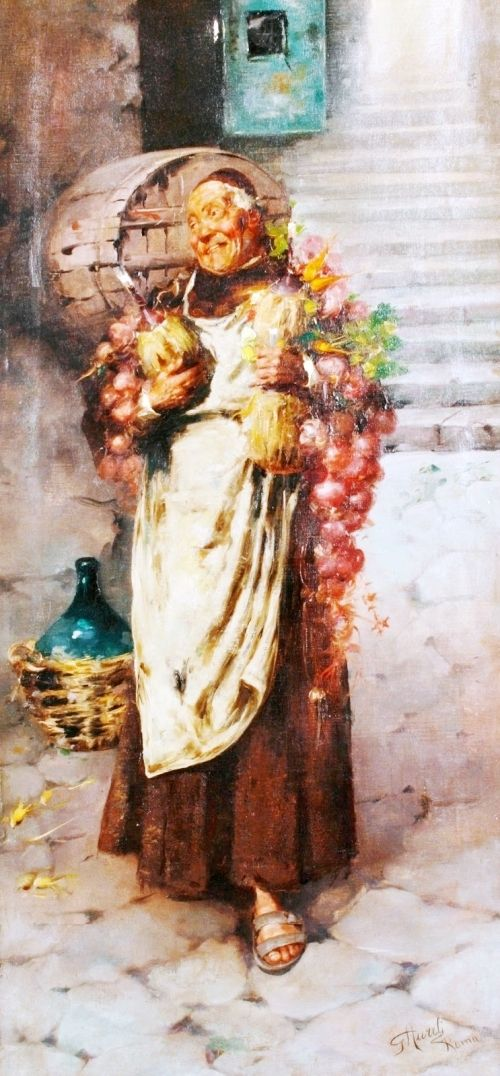
The Monk with Onions

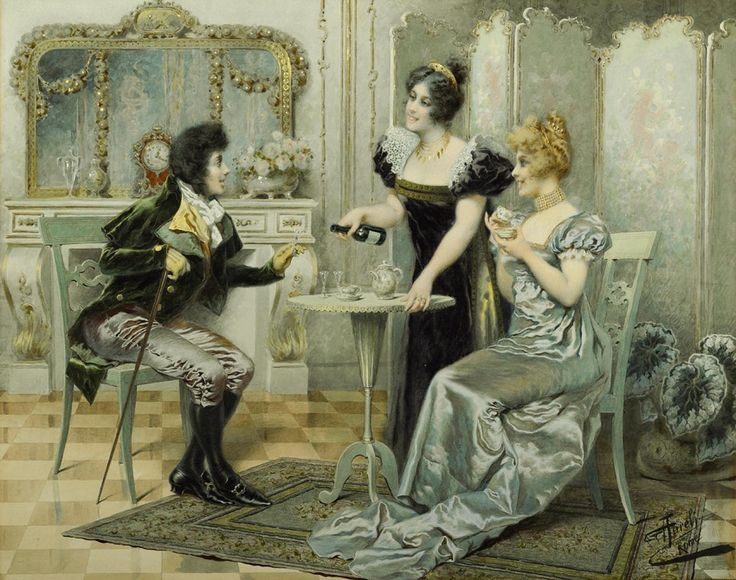
A Welcome Visitor

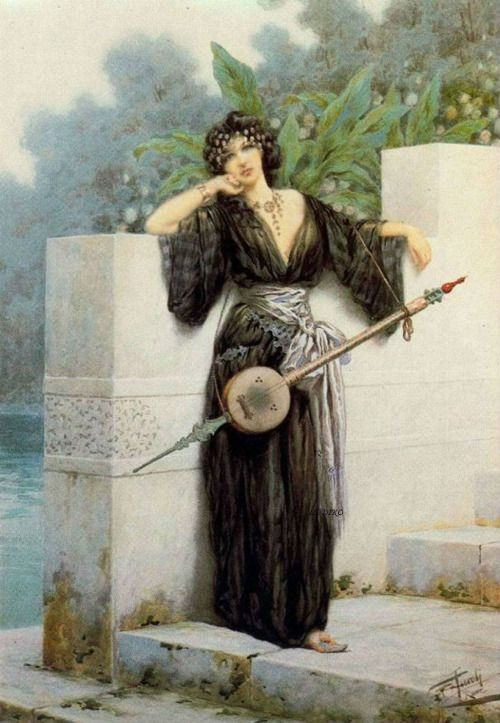
Oriental Beauty with Stringed Instrument

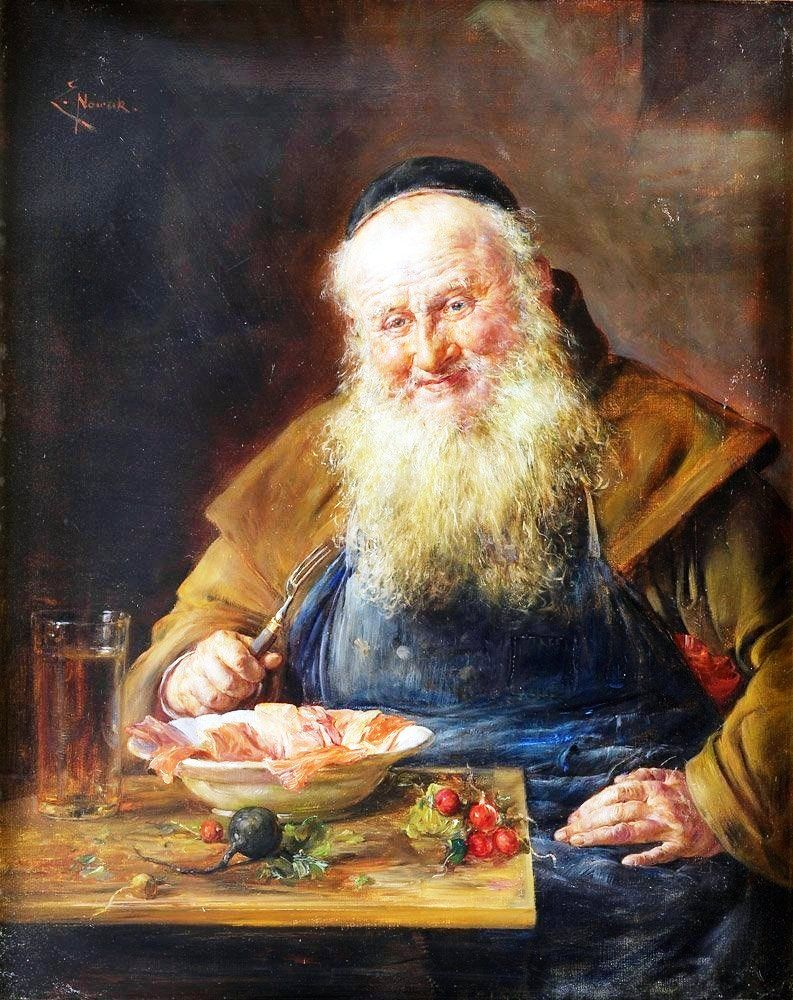
The Monk

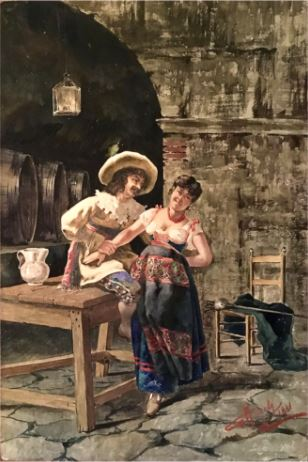
Romance in the
Wine Cellar

== Select list of paintings ==
- An Appointment for Hunting in 1500s. (Rome, 1883)
- Carica Lancieri Aosta at the Battle of Custoza (Rome, 1866)
- Romance in the Wine Cellar (1881)
- Emmanuel Philibert returns to Turin after the Battle of St. Quentin (Turin, 1884)
- Introduction Among the Ruins (1885)
- Idle Hours in the Harem
- Gossips in the Harem
- The Water Carrier
- Margaret of Valois reaches her husband Henry of Navarre (Bologna, 1888)
- Henry of Navarre domanda a Carlo IX the hand of his sister Margaret (Monaco, 1888)
- Marriage of Henry of Navarra and Margaret of Valois under Charles IX (Paris).
- Woman with Stringed Instrument
- Harem Scene
- Oriental Beauty (n.d.) Mathaf Gallery, London
