= Ettore Roesler Franz =

Italian painter and photographer

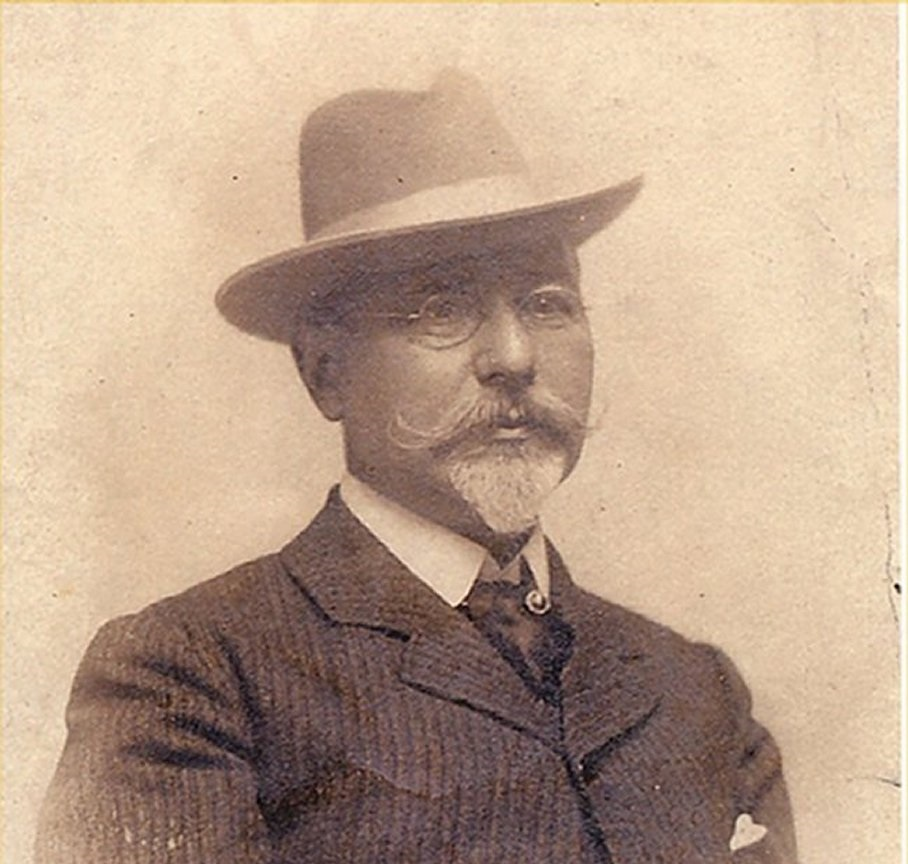
- Photograph from 1901 by Pio Tedeschi (1848–1915)
- Born: 11 May 1845; Rome, Papal States
- Died: 26 March 1907 (aged 61); Rome, Kingdom of Italy
- Education: Accademia di San Luca
- Notable work: Roma sparita

Ettore Roesler Franz (11 May 1845 – 26 March 1907) was an Italian painter and photographer. He was among the most prolific Italian watercolorists and vedutisti of the late nineteenth century.

== Biography ==
He was born to a family of German ancestry, that had moved to Rome from Sudetenland at the beginning of the 18th century. After attending a Catholic school, he began his artistic studies at the age of eighteen at the Accademia di San Luca.

From 1864 to 1872, he was employed at the British consulate, where he met Joseph Severn, an artist who was serving as Consul. It was Severn who first introduced him to watercolors, the medium that would become his preferred technique. In 1875, he and Nazzareno Cipriani developed a proposal that would become the Associazione degli Acquarellisti romani (Association of Watercolorists). Eight other artists would join as founding members: Cesare Biseo, Vincenzo Cabianca, Onorato Carlandi, Pio Joris, Cesare Maccari, Attilio Simonetti, Gustavo Simoni, and the Spaniard, Ramón Tusquets. They had their first exhibition in 1876.

His best known works are a series now known as "Roma Sparita" (Vanished Rome). It consists of 120 watercolors (roughly 20x30 in.), divided into three sets of forty, and created from 1878 to 1896. They depict parts of Rome that were in danger of disappearing as the city became more urbanized and modern. Many have vanished or changed dramatically, so these works constitute an invaluable historical record. He was also one of the first artists to paint scenes in the Roman Ghetto.

His clients over the following decades included Empress Maria Feodorovna, Kings Victor Emmanuel II and Umberto I, and Louis IV, Grand Duke of Hesse. He was named a Knight in the Order of the Crown of Italy in 1890. During the early 1900s, he was a regular participant in the Venice Biennale.

He died at his home on the Piazza San Claudio, aged sixty-two, and was interred at the Campo Verano.

== Selected paintings ==
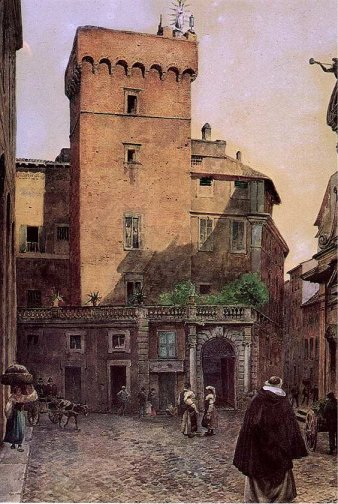
Torre della Scimmia

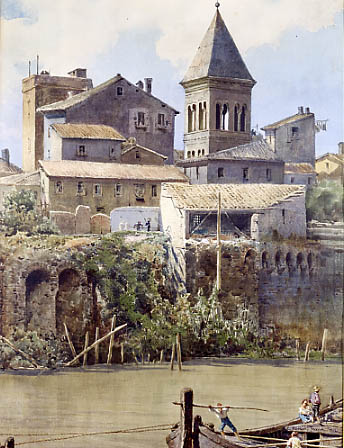
San Crisogono

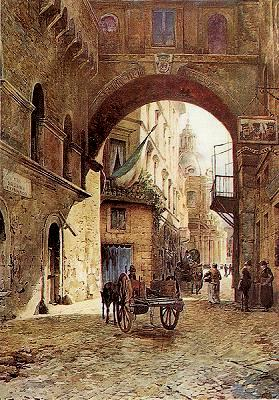
Via dell'Arco di
San Marco

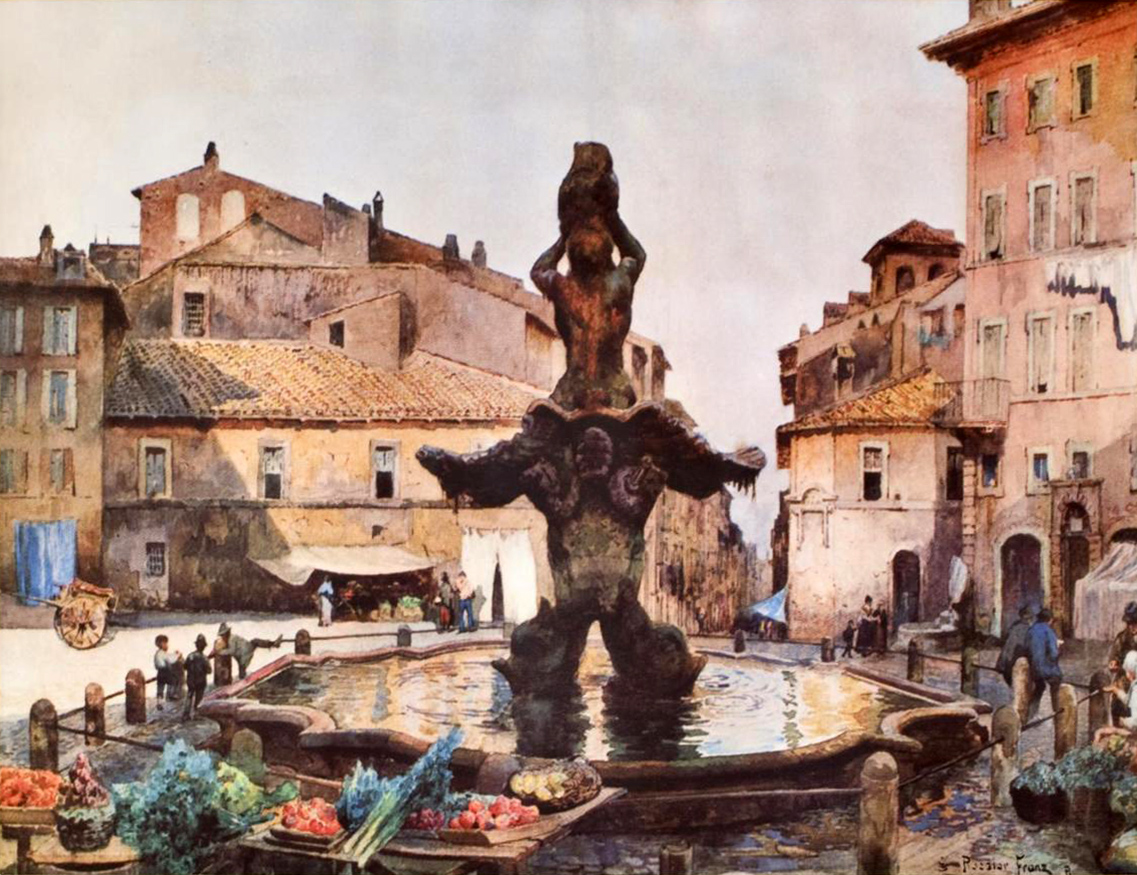
Piazza Barberini

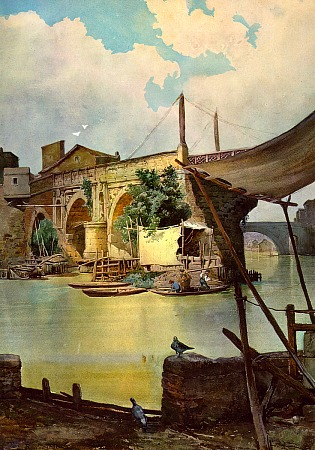
Ponte Rotto

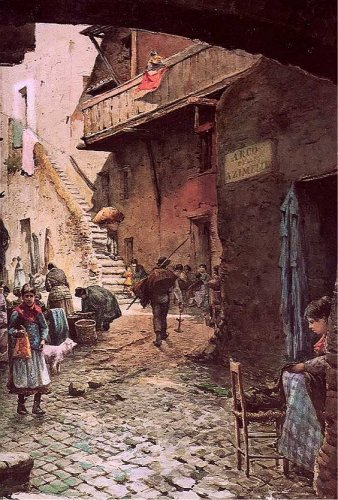
Roman Ghetto

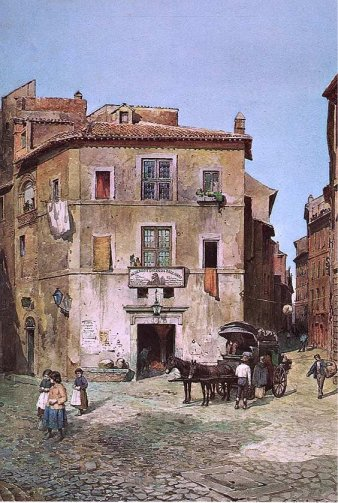
Albergo dell'Orso
