= Cesare Bertolla =

Italian painter (1845–1920)

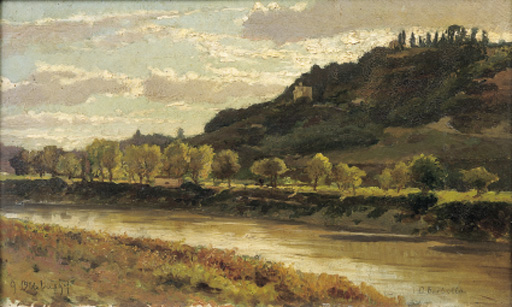
Paesaggio fluviale, 1897

Cesare Bertolla (1845–1920) was an Italian painter, described as specializing in the painting of landscapes with animals and figures from the marshy and malarial (Paludi) regions, painting in areas around Rome.

He was born in Lucca. He studied in Rome, where he became part of an informal set of artists and painters including Carlo Ferrari, Enrico Coleman, Alessandro Coleman, Onorato Carlandi, and Cesare Pascarella. In the Turin Exhibition of 1880, he exhibited Autumn. In the 1883 Mostra Internazionale Artistica of Rome, he exhibited Le bufale nella pineta, La Porta San Lorenzo, and La Porta del Cristiano al Marocco. At a Roman exhibition of 1889, he submitted Mattino, Alla spalletta, La valle del Teverone, and Ricordo di Terracina. He died in 1920, in Rome.
