= Museo di Roma in Trastevere =

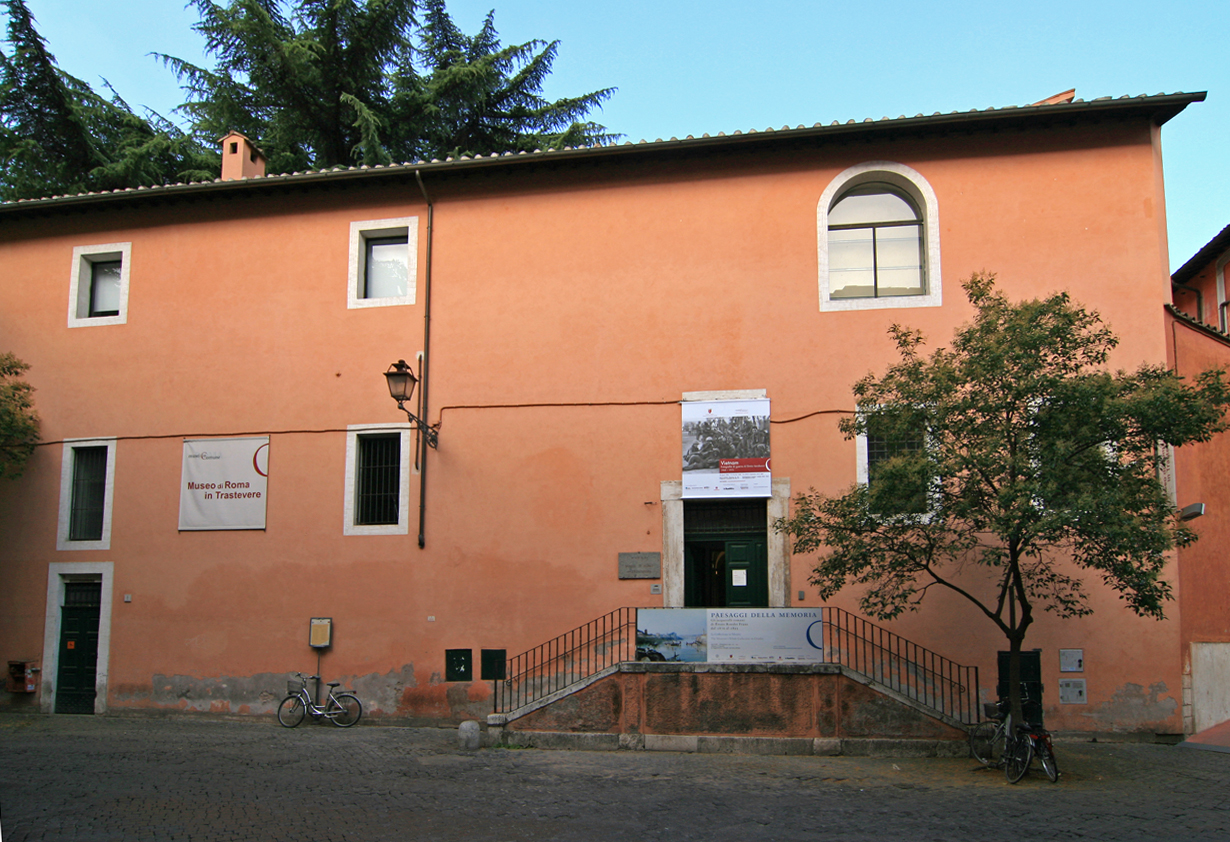
- The convent of Sant'Egidio, home of the museum
- Click on the map for a fullscreen view
- Established: 1977
- Location: piazza S. Egidio 1/b, 00153 Roma
- Coordinates: 41°53′24″N 12°28′08″E
- Type: Museum of cultural history
- Website: museodiromaintrastevere.it

The Museo di Roma in Trastevere was established in 1977 in the restored Carmelite convent of Sant'Egidio. It was initially known as the Museo del Folklore e dei Poeti Romaneschi ("museum of folklore and Roman dialect poets"). Following a period of closure it was reopened under its present name in 2000. In addition to a permanent collection related to the recent culture of Rome the museum also houses temporary exhibitions, including the annual World Press Photo exhibition. It is part of the Museo di Roma.

== History ==
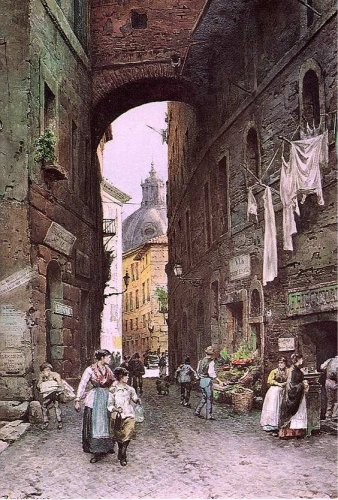
Via Giulio Romano, painting by Ettore Roesler Franz

The material on exhibition includes the so-called “Roman Scenes”, life-size models which were previously exhibited in the Museo di Roma at Palazzo Braschi. There was limited space for them at that museum and it was also thought appropriate to transfer them to Trastevere, which is a part of Rome where popular Roman culture is considered to remain strong.

== Exhibits ==
The museum's permanent exhibition focuses on Roman life in the late eighteenth and nineteenth centuries. Major themes are costume, folk dancing, festivals, and crafts. The collection includes paintings, prints, drawings and watercolours, including the series on Roma sparita ("vanished Rome") by Ettore Roesler Franz (1845–1907), and life-size representations of day-to-day life, known as "Roman Scenes". Exhibition of the Franz water colours is rotated in order to conserve them. Other painters represented include Samuel Prout, Bartolomeo Pinelli, Adriano Trojani, Guillaume Frédéric Ronmy, and Arnoldo Corrodi. There is also a gallery of photographs. The “Roman Scenes” show a chemist's, a room where a wine cart is stored, the courtyard of an inn where dancing is taking place, the inside of an inn, a square with a public scribe, and two pipers in front of a votive kiosk. The museum has some manuscripts of the Roman dialect poet Giuseppe Gioachino Belli, and also contains some of the personal possessions of another Italian dialect poet, Trilussa (1871–1950), which were donated to Rome after his death. The “Trilussa Room” consists of a video installation together with paintings and other items belonging to the poet.

== See also ==
- List of museums in Rome

Preceded by Museo di Roma	Landmarks of Rome; Museo di Roma in Trastevere	Succeeded by Museo nazionale del Palazzo di Venezia
