= Francesco Sagliano =

Italian painter (1826–1890)

Francesco Sagliano (1826–1890) was an Italian painter.

Francesco Sagliano, Antonietta De Pace, Museo civico of Gallipoli

== Bibliography ==
He was born in Santa Maria Capua Vetere, and resident in Naples. He was a pupil of Giuseppe Bonolis. In 1859, his Christ of the People won a gold medal at an exhibition. In 1870, he exhibited at the Mostra Italiana di Belle Arti in Parma, among them an oil canvas depicting An Hour of Calm (Impression of the Buvver); Anthesterios or the Festival of Flowers (Pompeian custom scene); and Margaret of Swabia at the tomb of Conradin. He exhibited other studies, such as La gioia materna, King Vittorio Emanuele II enters Rome on July 1, 1871, Stato Agricolo, Pescatore del Sarno and La Foce del Sarno. At the 1880 Turin Exhibition, he exhibited Various terra cotta models and il pasto alle murene (Genre painting of Roman customs), the last he also exhibited at the 1881 Esposizione of Milan.
