= Museo di Roma =

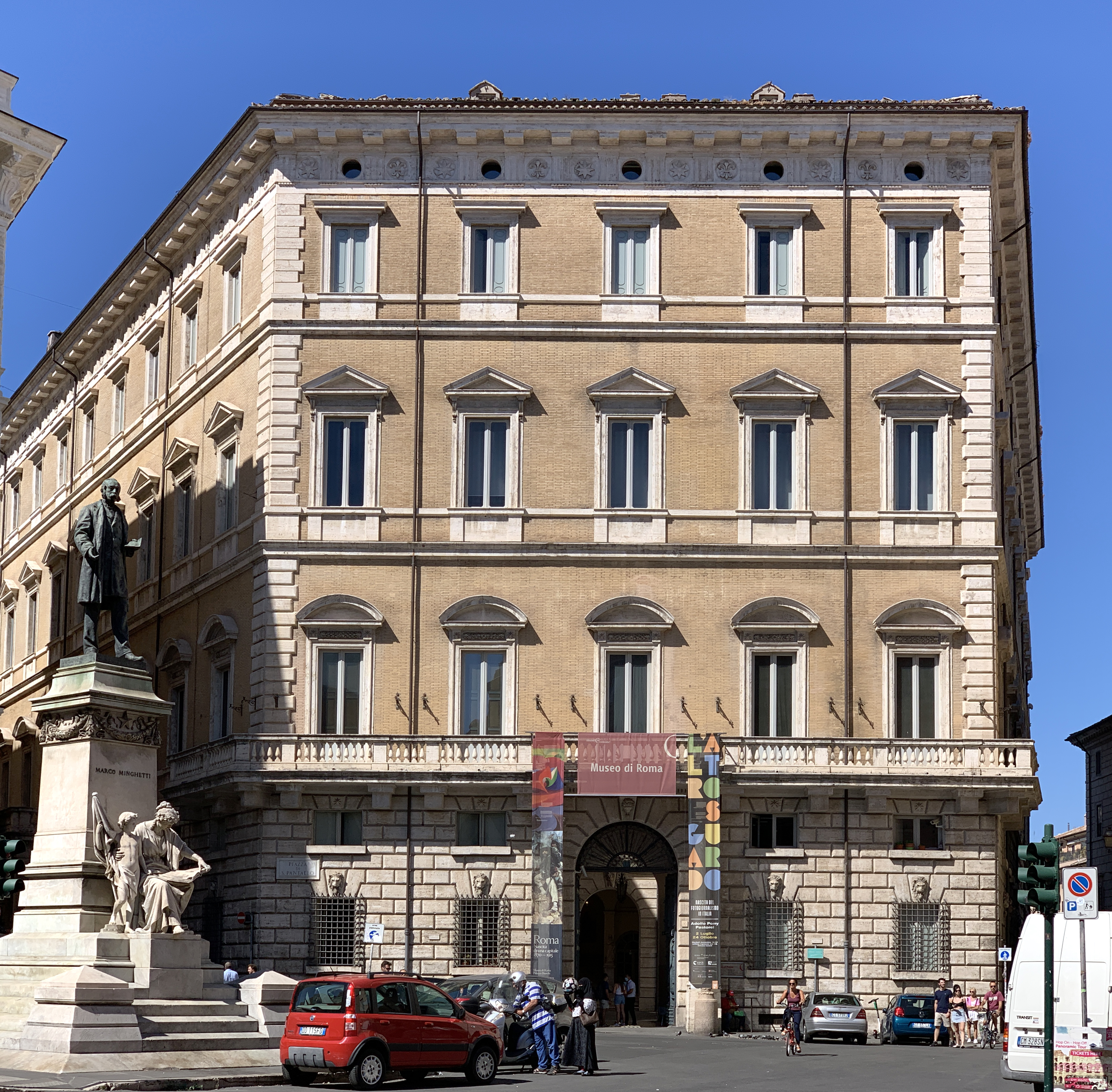
- Palazzo Braschi, home of the museum
- Click on the map for a fullscreen view
- Established: 1930
- Location: Piazza di S. Pantaleo 10, 00186 Roma 00186
- Coordinates: 41°53′50″N 12°28′22″E
- Type: Art museum
- Website: museodiroma.it

The Museo di Roma is a museum in Rome, Italy, part of the network of Roman civic museums. The museum was founded in the Fascist era with the aim of documenting the local history and traditions of the "old Rome" that was rapidly disappearing, but following many donations and acquisitions of works of art is now principally an art museum. The collections initially included 120 water-colours by the nineteenth-century painter Ettore Roesler Franz of Roma sparita, "vanished Rome", later moved to the Museo di Roma in Trastevere.

== History ==
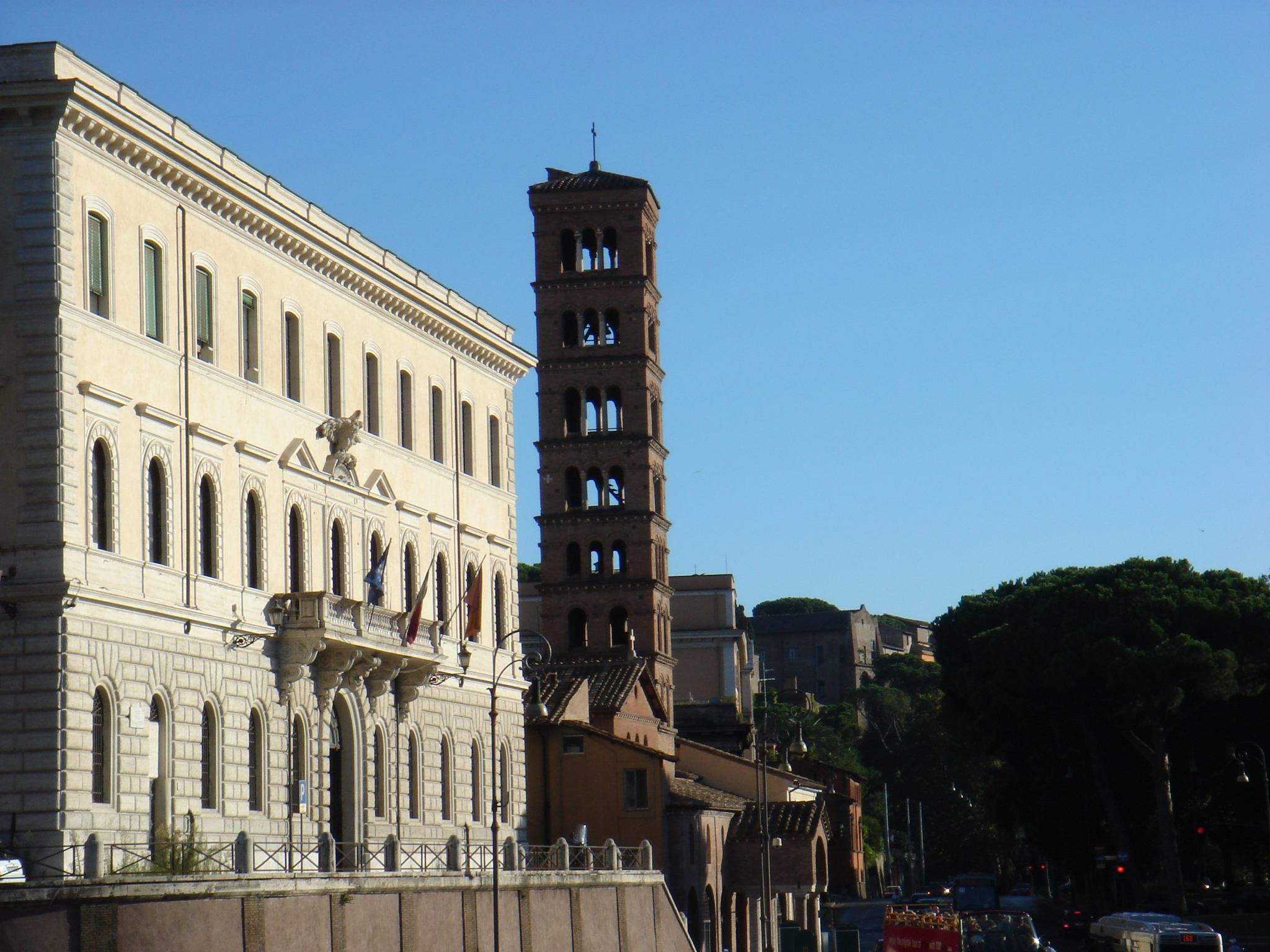
Façade of the Pastificio Pantanella, former home of the museum, on Piazza Bocca della Verità

The museum was founded by the art historian Antonio Muñoz, who was director of the Antichità e Belle Arti ("antiquities and fine arts department") of the government of Rome. It was the first civic museum of the city. It was housed in the Pastificio Pantanella, a large former pasta factory in Piazza Bocca della Verità, overlooking the Circo Massimo in the via dei Cerchi, in the Ripa rione of the city. The factory building also housed the Museo dell'Impero Romano, and was renamed "Palazzo dei Musei". The Museo di Roma opened on 21 April 1930; Muñoz was its first director. When the Second World War began in 1939, the museum closed.

The museum re-opened only in 1952, in a new political climate and in a new location at Palazzo Braschi, a Neoclassical palace near Piazza Navona, built in the early years of the nineteenth century by Luigi Braschi Onesti, which since 1949 had already housed the new Galleria Comunale d'Arte Moderna.

== Collections ==
The collection of the museum was at first intended only to illustrate and document the past. Thanks to numerous bequests, donations and acquisitions – among them a collection of some 5000 drawings, engravings and old illustrated books belonging to Antonio Muñoz – the holdings of the museum now include many works of art, and it has become primarily an art museum. Artists represented include Pompeo Batoni, Giuseppe Bottani, Ippolito Caffi, Antonio Canova, Giuseppe Ceracchi, Giuseppe Bartolomeo Chiari, Lievin Cruyl, Felice Giani, Pietro Labruzzi, Francesco Mochi, Giovanni Paolo Panini, Bartolomeo Pinelli, Giovanni Battista Piranesi, Joshua Reynolds and Nicola Salvi (designer of the Trevi Fountain).

| Preceded by Museo delle Mura | Landmarks of Rome; Museo di Roma | Succeeded by Museo di Roma in Trastevere |
