= Achille Vertunni =

Italian painter (1826–1897)

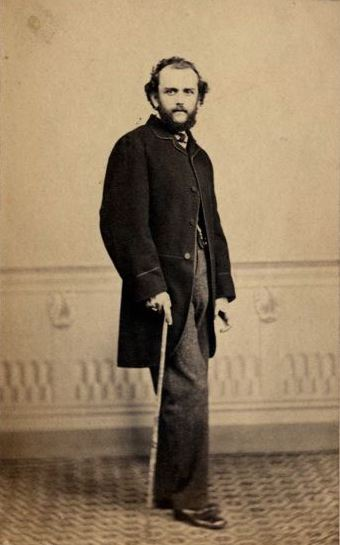
Achille Vertunni, 1865

Achille Vertunni (March 1826 – 1897) was an Italian painter.

== Biography ==
Vertunni was a Neapolitan nobleman who initially studied law under Roberto Savarese, although his family had intended for him to become an architect, and enrolled him to study mathematics under Ferdinando de Luca. Vertunni however gravitated towards the visual arts, causing a rift with his father, who would not countenance his son working as a penniless artist and eventually disinherited Achille. He enrolled to study landscape painting under Salvatore Fergola, and after just eight months went on to serve his first apprenticeship under the historical painter Giuseppe Bonolis, and eventually with Francesco De Sanctis. He is said to have been influenced by Gabriele Smargiassi.

In 1851 Vertunni entered the yearly competition held by the Accademia di Belle Arti di Napoli (Naples Academy of Fine Arts), but the judges failed to agree on a single winner for the first prize, opting instead for awarding a silver medal each, ex equo, to Vertunni and Filippo Palizzi, a fellow pupil of Bonolis', rumoured to have been the judges' favourite, owing to his links with the academy.

As part of their prize, the two artists received a stipend to study in Rome and in 1853 Vertunni moved there, painting the Santa Margherita da Cortona for the Esposizione di Firenze of 1861. In the same year, he painted La Pia de' Tolomei and Dante in the Forest. He faced difficulty in selling the latter, as an innovative painting portraying Pia not in a classic portrait, but against a Maremman landscape; in spite of some financial difficulties, Vertunni persevered and became a prolific painter.

Later in life, he was named Cavaliere dell Ordine della Corona d'Italia (Order of the Crown of Italy), and honorary professor of the Reale Istituto di Belle Arti di Napoli and of the Brera Academy of Milan.

Vertunni had 13 children from his marriage and his Atelier, in the street best known for its painters, Via Margutta, became a fashionable destination for the nobility and wealthy patrons on their Grand Tour of Europe. Famous, as well as less known artists of the period gathered there, alongside nobility and protegés of the Papacy, in Rome. Gradually the profile of the domestic visitors to the Atelier morphed, and over the years between 1868 and 1870, Garibaldini and other supporters of Italian Unification began to frequent the regular banquets and soireés where the Baron entertained the crowned heads of Europe, renowned musicians as well as political figures such as General La Marmora.

Tragically, the constant use of lead-based pigments, which like many painters he mixed by hand, gradually poisoned Vertunni, who suffered progressive paralysis over the final 20 years of his life. His wife Guendalina, and his two youngest daughters, Giuseppina and Pia, cared for the painter until his death, in 1897. Among his pupils were Pio Joris and Pietro Barucci.

Among Vertunni's works are:

- Paludi Pontine, (1861, Florence, Esposizione Nazionale)
- La Torre d'Astura, (1862, Milan, Esposizione Nazionale)
- The Maremme, Kidnap of a Woman of Capri by Tunisian Corsairs, (1866, Milan National Exposition)
- Paestum
- Campagna Romana
- Encounter of Tasso with Marco Sciarra
- Manfredi con la sua famiglia ricoverati nel bosco dopo la presa di San Germano
- Un pensier mesto della madre cara
- Un desiderio di pace e di amore
- Beach of Baia
- Il torrente la Nera presso Borgo di Cerreto
- Storm in the Paludi Pontine
- Roma Vecchia
- Approach to Paestum
- Una Vetta degli Appenini
