= Francesco Netti =

Italian painter (1832–1894)

Francesco Saverio Netti (December 24, 1832 – August 28, 1894) was an Italian painter.

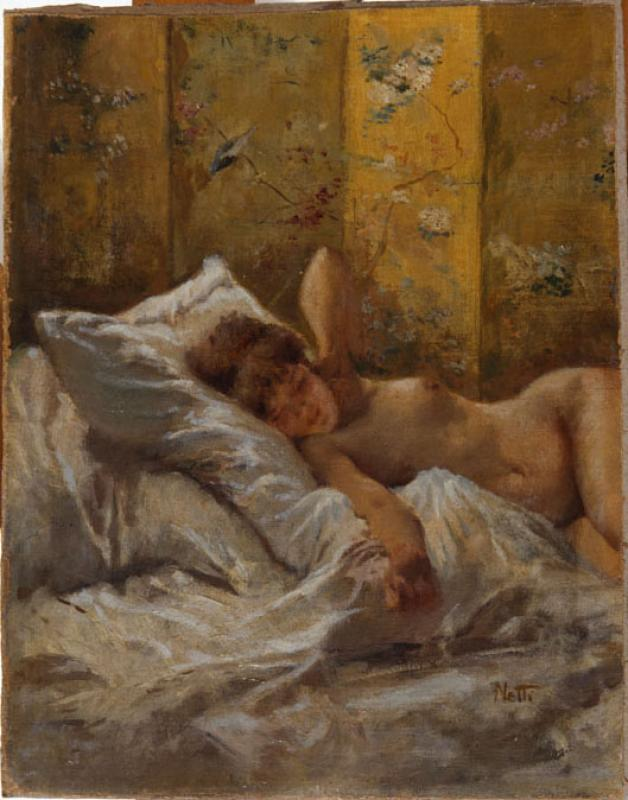
Francesco Netti, Nuda sul letto, oil on canvas, 1884–1886, Pinacoteca di Bari

== Biography ==
Netti was born at Santeramo in Colle, in Apulia, then part of the Kingdom of the Two Sicilies. By 1850 he had completed his school studies and begun a legal career, but he switched to painting, by 1855 enrolling in the Academy of Fine Arts in Naples. He also studied under Giuseppe Bonolis and at an independent art school run by Tommaso De Vivo and Michele De Napoli. In 1856 Netti left Naples for Rome, where he stayed until 1860. Returning to Naples, he worked for a time in the studios of Filippo Palizzi and Domenico Morelli. In 1866 he went to Paris, where he formed part of the Italian contingent which exhibited works at the Universal Exposition. He left the city in 1872, having seen the Siege of Paris of the previous year, during the Franco-Prussian War. After the end of that war, he was awarded a bronze cross by the Geneva Convention for forming part of a military ambulance team during the hostilities.

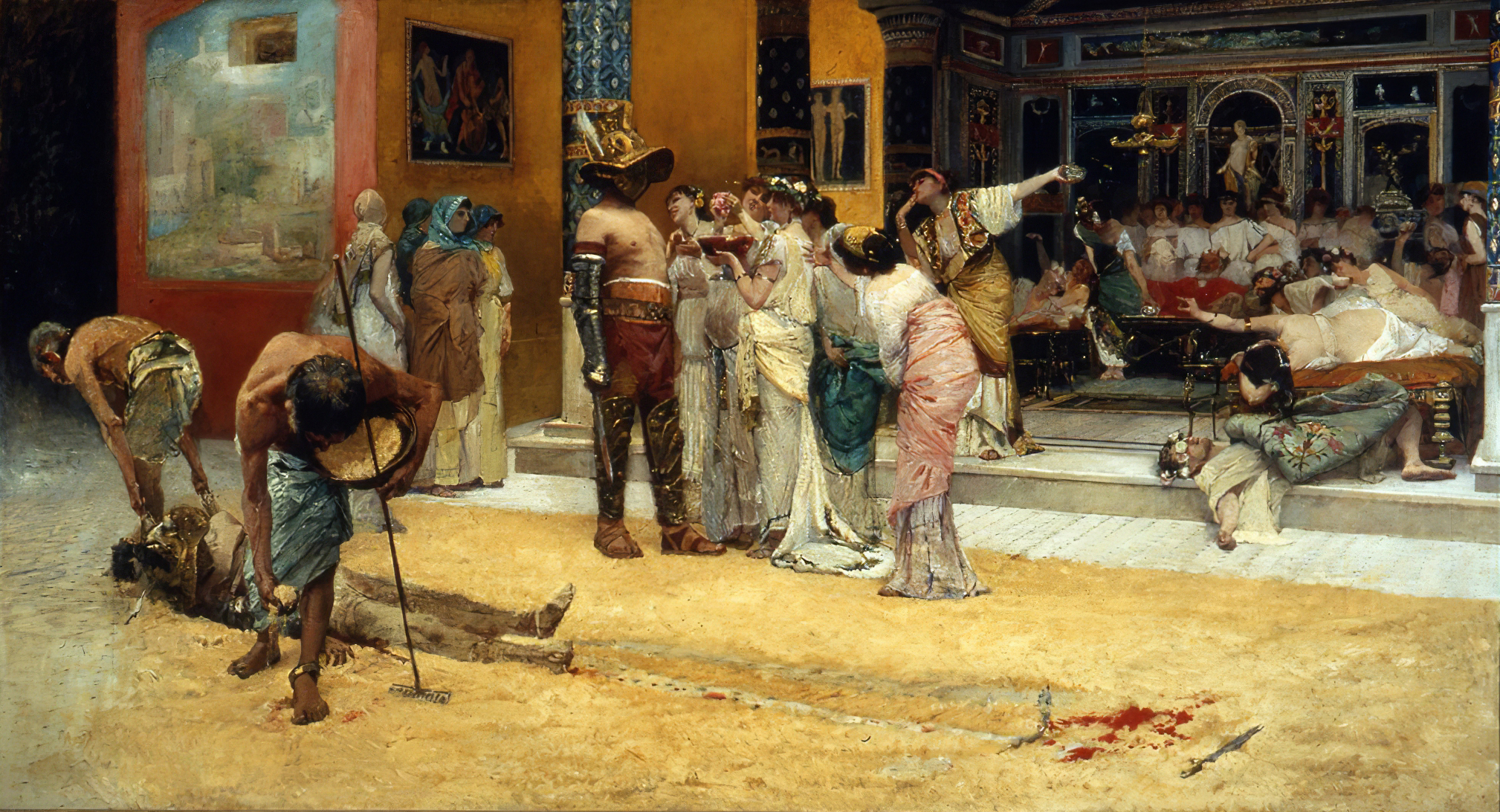
Gladiator Fight During Meal At Pompeii, 1880

He returned to Italy and settled in Naples. He published various books on art and wrote for several journals, including articles called l'Italia at the Exhibition of Paris; l'Arte in Italia; L'Illustrazione Italiana. He was knighted as a member of the Order of the Crown of Italy, and in 1868 was awarded the Order of Santi Maurizio e Lazzaro; and finally in 1876, became honorary professor at the Institute of Fine Arts of Naples.

He was awarded a silver and bronze medals for depicting the Arrival to Paris of the Commissariato Italiano for the 1867 Universal Exposition. Among his works are Death of St Joseph Calasanz, (1859); The Madness of Haydee, displayed at the 1860 Exhibition of Florence; After an Orgy, depicting a Pulcinella character in a masked ball; Episode of May 15, 1848 in Naples; La sera del dì di festa, depicting a raucous party with dancing; Donne che si preparano per un ballo in maschera; Una processione di penitenza durante l'eruzione del Vesuvio del 1631, al ponte della Maddalena; La pioggia; Uscendo dal ballo all'alba; and Ricordo di Parigi; and Mary Magdalen at the tomb of Jesus, painted for the cathedral of Altamura.

Netti also painted in Neo-Pompeian style, including Gladiator games during a meal in Pompei and Greek Choir ascending to Temple, awarded a prize at the 1876 Exhibition of Naples. To the 1883 Exposition of Rome, he sent a morbidly sensual canvas: Le signore alla Corte il assise. At the 1884 exhibition he displayed La Siesta. In 1887 at Venice, he exhibited: Donne turche che prendono il caffè e La crisi. His painting L'Abbeveratoio, and Un ritorno dalla campagna(1883), were sent out of the country. Netti also completed many portraits and minor works in watercolors and oil. He worked in both Paris and the artists' colony at Grez-sur-Loing later in life. He died on August 28, 1894, in Santeramo in Colle.
