= Pinacoteca metropolitana di Bari =

Coordinates: 41.1214°N 16.8816°E

Metropolitan Art Gallery of Bari
- Pinacoteca metropolitana di Bari
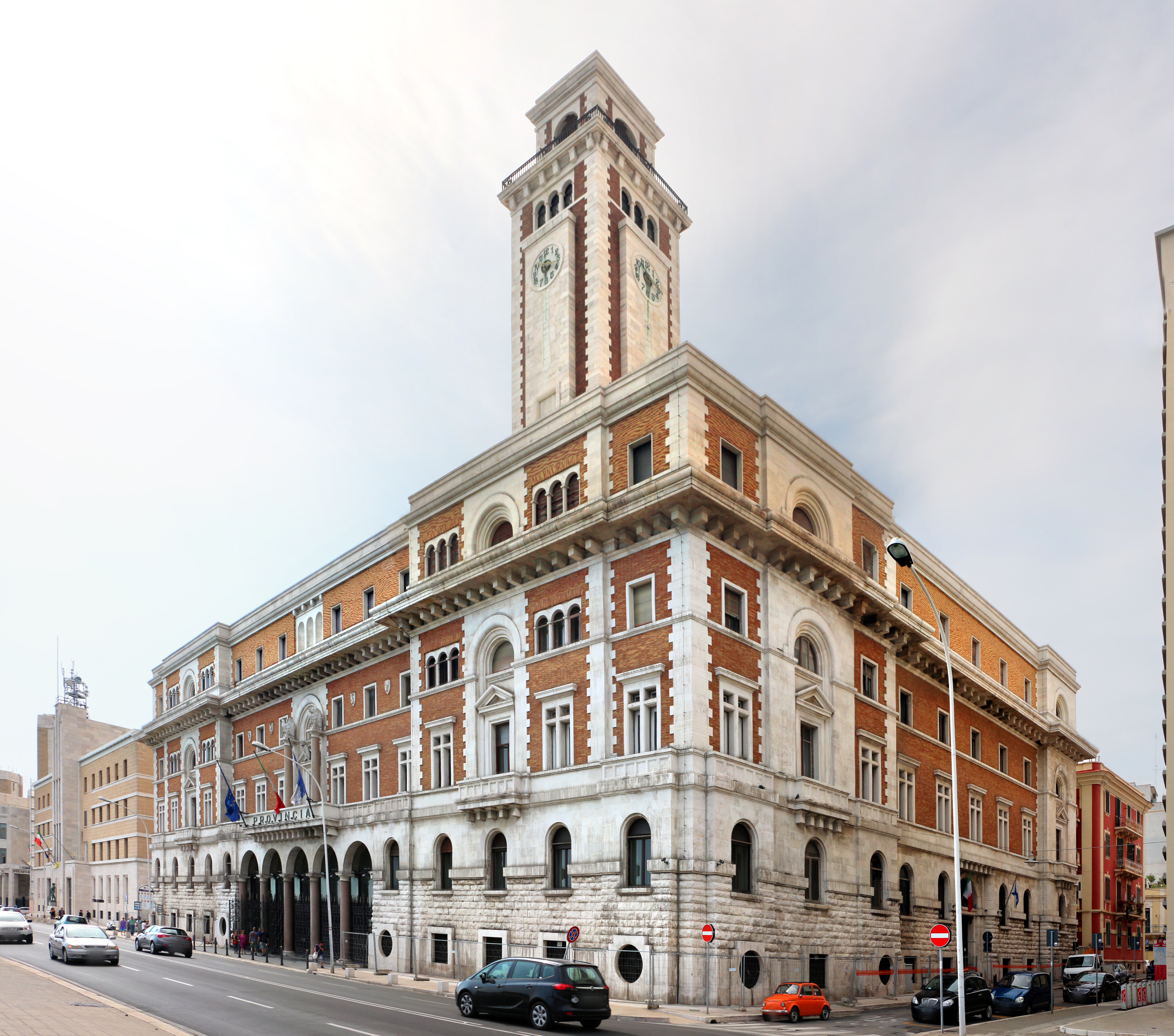
- Established: 12 July 1928
- Location: Via Spalato 19, Bari, Apulia
- Website: pinacotecabari.it

The Pinacoteca metropolitana di Bari or Pinacoteca C. Giaquinto is a public gallery of paintings and museum of artworks in the city of Bari, Italy. The museum displays a range of artistic works connected to the region of Apulia.

== History ==
The gallery was founded July 12, 1928 and was initially located at the local government center. The Pinacoteca was named in honor of the painter Corrado Giaquinto. In 1936, it moved to the province's palace, by the sea in Bari, where it now stands.

The collection contains works by artists such as Bartolomeo Vivarini, Paris Bordon, Giovanni Bellini, Tintoretto, Palma il Giovane, Pacecco De Rosa, Luca Giordano, Corrado Giaquinto, Francesco De Mura, Giuseppe De Nittis, Giovanni Boldini, Francesco Netti, Giorgio de Chirico, and Giorgio Morandi.

== Collection ==
- A medieval section
- Venetian paintings of the fifteenth and sixteenth centuries donated by numerous Apulia Churches
- Apulian paintings from late medieval and Neapolitan school from beginning medieval centuries
- A section of Corrado Giaquinto's paintings
- A nineteenth century Neapolitan and Southern Italy paintings important collection
- Paintings by the 19th century Tuscan school of the “Macchiaioli”
- Apulian Medieval Majolica ceramics
- An antique Neapolitan nativity Presepe
- Antique apparel
- Nineteenth and twentieth century important paintings, together with important contemporary paintings and artistic works
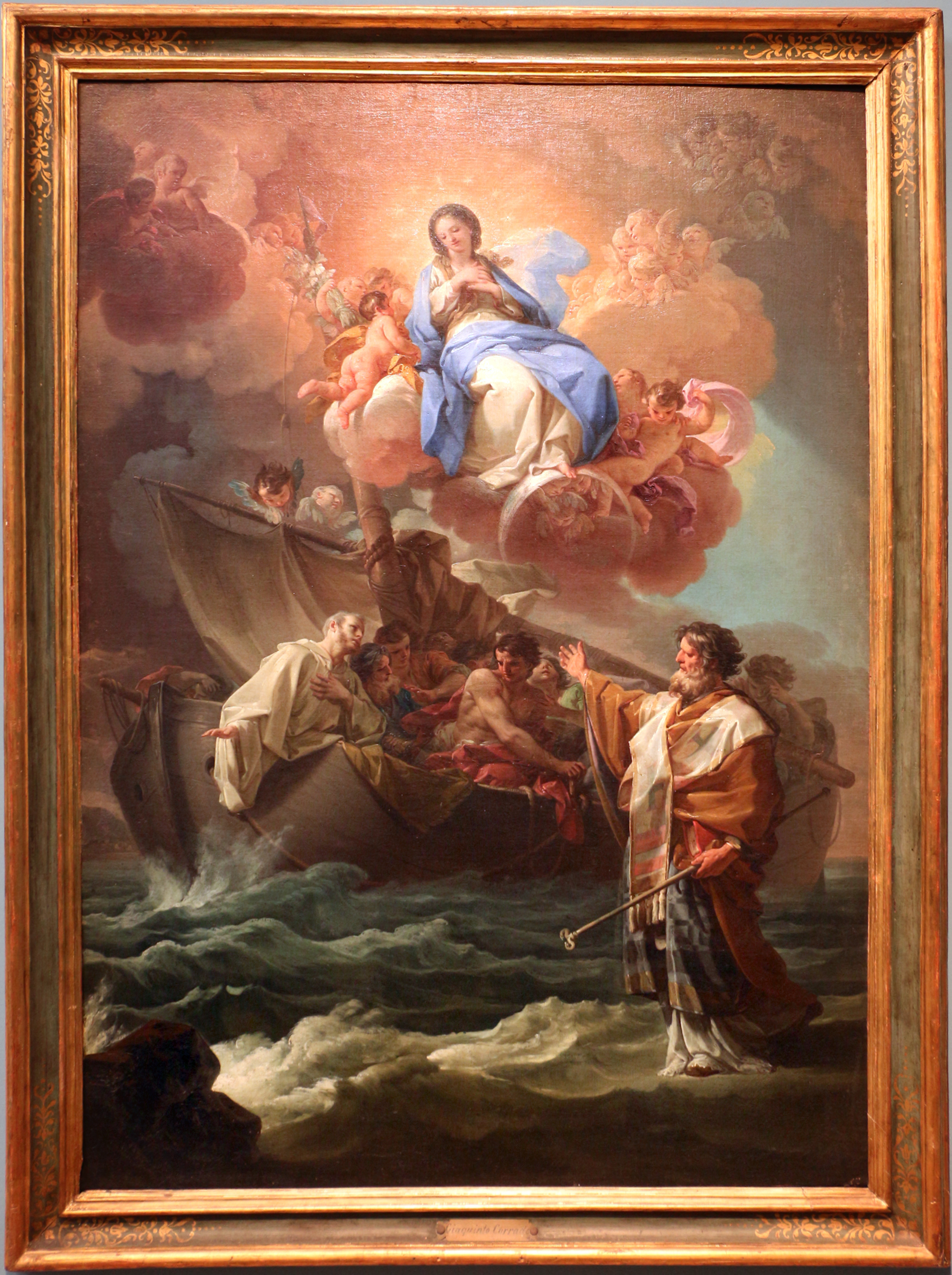
Corrado Giaquinto, St. Nicholas saves the castaways

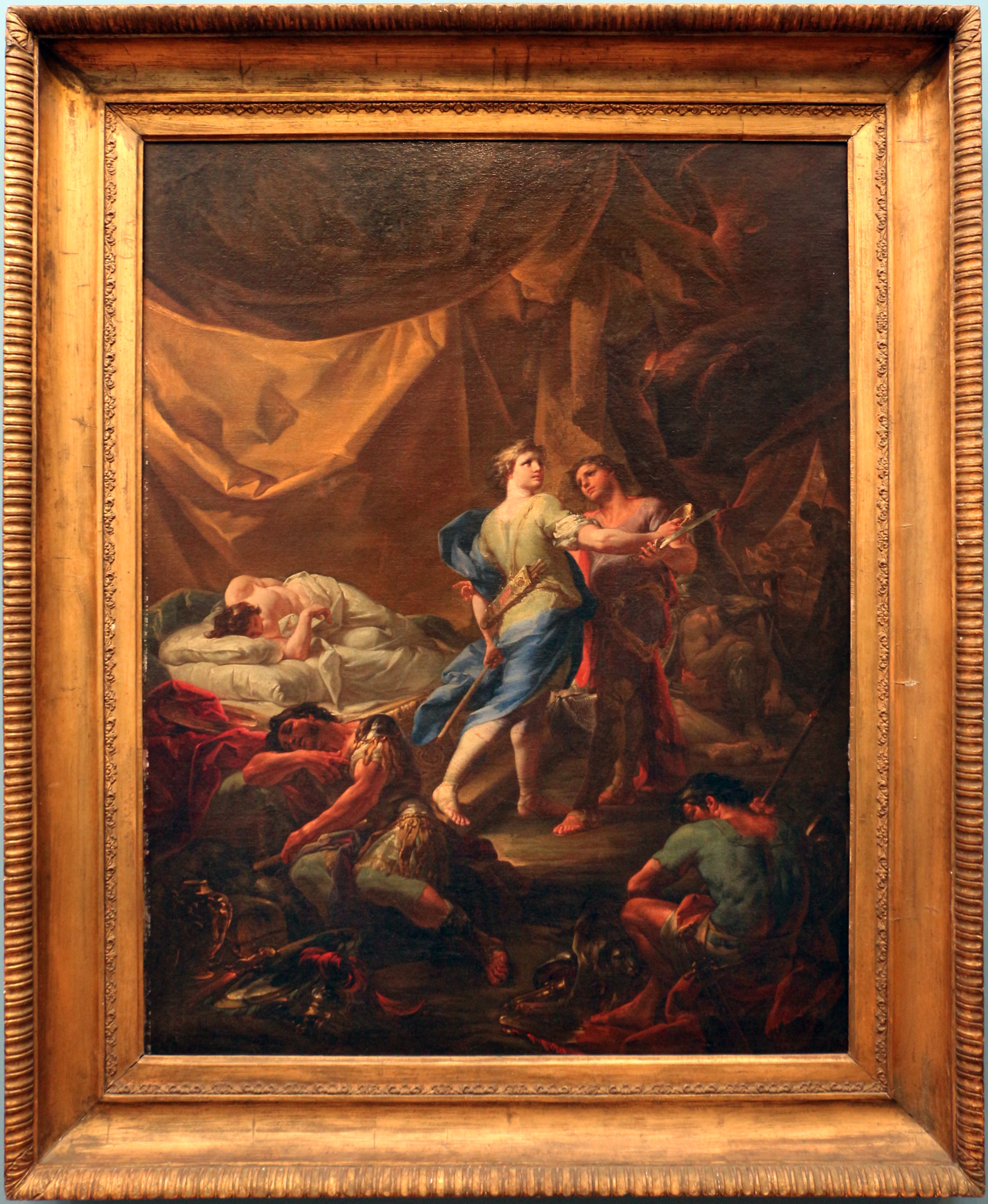
Corrado Giaquinto, Ulysses and Diomedes in the Resus tent
