= Pietro Barucci (architect) =

Italian architect (1922–2023)

- Born: 9 November 1922; Rome, Kingdom of Italy
- Died: 6 May 2023 (aged 100); Rome, Italy
- Education: Sapienza University of Rome
- Occupation: Architect

Pietro Barucci (9 November 1922 – 6 May 2023) was an Italian architect and urban planner, mainly active in his native Rome.

== Biography ==
Born in Rome on 9 November 1922, he was named after his paternal grandfather Pietro Barucci. He studied architecture under Arnaldo Foschini and Adalberto Libera, and graduated in 1946.

Among his projects, he designed the INA district and the residential complex of La Rosa in Livorno, and the urban residential plan in Naples (1982–1992) with the redevelopment of the districts of San Giovanni a Teduccio and Barra. In Rome, he most notably designed the Industrial Institute in Pietralata (1961–1970); the ENPAM (Ente Previdenza Medici) headquarters in via Torino (1962–1965); the business district of piazzale Caravaggio (1963–1969); the ISES-IACP complex in Spinaceto (1965–1977); the residential areas of Laurentino (1971–1984), Torrevecchia and Quartaccio (1978–1984); "Serpentone" residential complex in Tor Bella Monaca (1980–1981). He also worked on urban plannings in Tunisia and Ethiopia during the sixties and the seventies.

In June 2018, Barucci stated that the urban planning in Rome had become a disaster, as he criticised the city's corruption.

Barucci died in Rome on 6 May 2023, at the age of 100.

== Bibliography ==
- Giuseppe Cuccia (1991). Urbanistica, edilizia, infrastrutture di Roma Capitale 1870-1990. Rome-Bari: Laterza.
- Irene De Guttry (1989). Guida di Roma moderna dal 1870 ad oggi. Rome: De Luca Editori d'Arte.
- Achille Maria Ippolito; Mauro Pagnotta (1982). Roma costruita. Le vicende, le problematiche e le realizzazioni dell'architettura a Roma dal 1946 al 1981. Rome: Fratelli Palombi.
- Ruggero Lenci (2009). Pietro Barucci architetto. Milan: Electa.
- Piero Ostilio Rossi (2000). Roma. Guida all'architettura moderna 1909-2000. Bari: Laterza.
