= Enrico Tarenghi =

Italian painter (1848–1938)

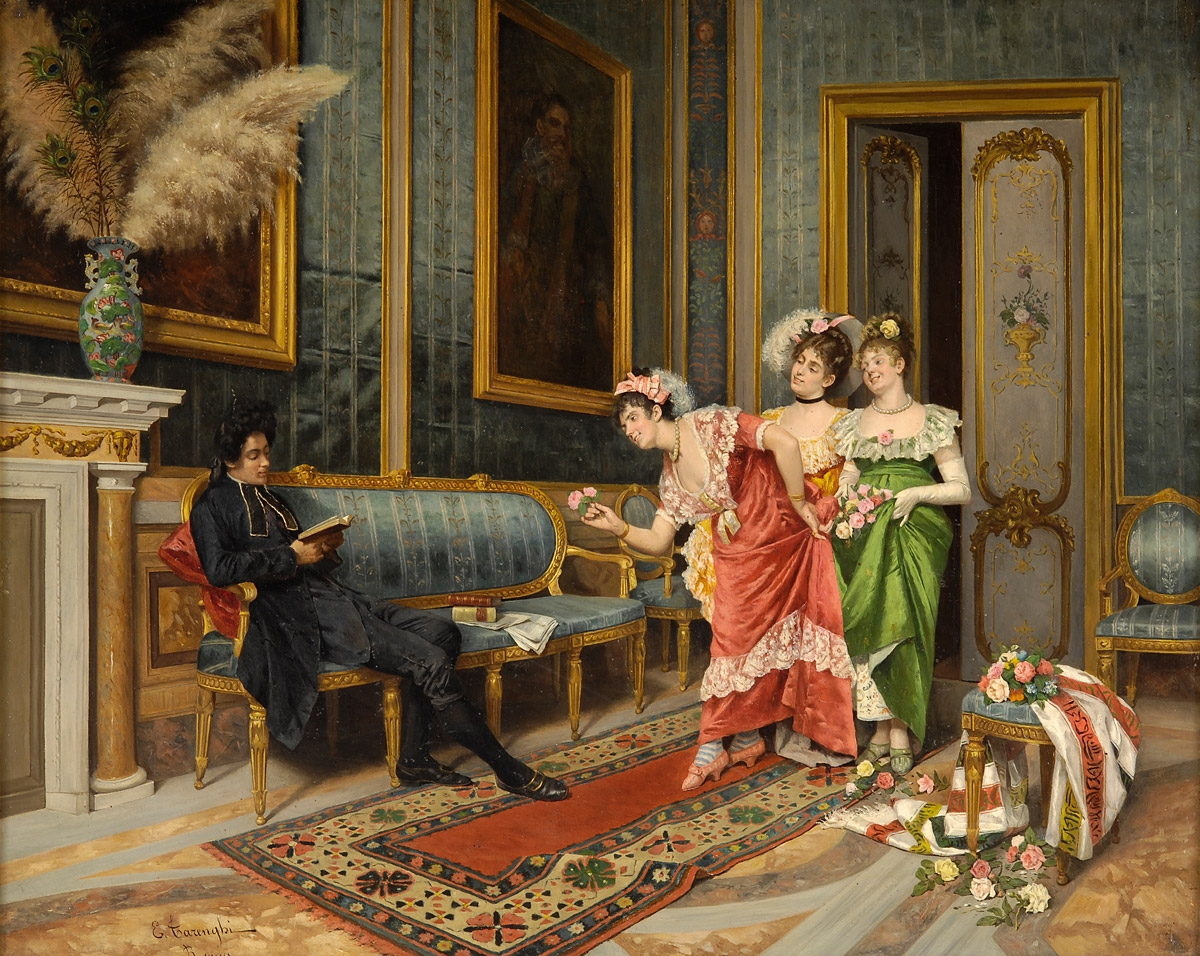
- The Three Graces
- Born: 14 April 1848; Rome
- Died: 3 April 1938 (aged 89); Rome
- Education: Academy of St Luke, Rome
- Known for: Painter
- Movement: Orientalist

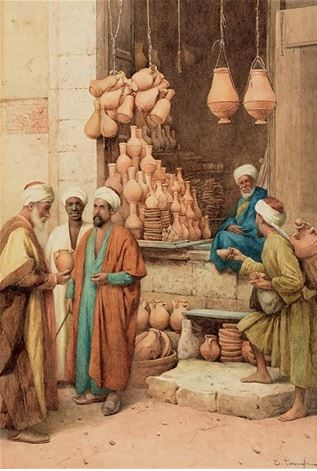
The Pottery Vendor

Enrico Tarenghi (14 April 1848 – 3 April 1938) was an Italian painter, mainly of genre and orientalist paintings. He preferred to work in watercolors.

== Life and work ==
He was born and resident in Rome. He studied in the Academy of St Luke in Rome in the early 1860s. He maintained a joint studio with Nazzareno Cipriani and Giuseppe Aureli on the Via Margutta.

Tarenghi and Filippo Bartolini (1861–1908) were members of the so-called "Gruppo Simoni". They may have traveled to Algeria with Gustavo Simoni in the early 1890s.

He specialised in watercolor and orientalist scenes. He was influenced by the style of the painter Escordi. Like many other members of the Italian school of Orientalist art, he made extensive use of photography in his work. For example, he used a photograph as the template for the background in his painting of a pottery shop.

His paintings The Return from Work and Prayer by Muslims were first exhibited in Turin, in 1880, the latter also in Milan the next year. In Rome, in 1883, he had two canvases: Abbey of San Gregorio in Venice and Fulvia. In 1884 in Turin, he displayed an oil: Gelosia, and a watercolor: The Mother. In Livorno 1886, he exhibited Meditazione. Among his other works are: The convalescent woman; Oh, potess' io (from Faust, Act one, first scene); and the Temple of Antonio and Faustina, exhibited at Venice, in 1887.

== Select list of paintings ==
- At the Shrine
- Carpet sellers
- The Carpet Seller by the Nile
- Prayer by Muslims 1880
- Conversation by the Fire. 1881
- Praying Muslim, 1882
- Abbey of San Gregorio in Venice and Fulvia 1883
- Evening Prayer
- Leaving Prayers
- ''Worshippers in a Mosque
- Girl with Tambourine on the Arch of Titus, Roman Forum
