= Pasquale Ricca =

Italian painter (1854–1910)

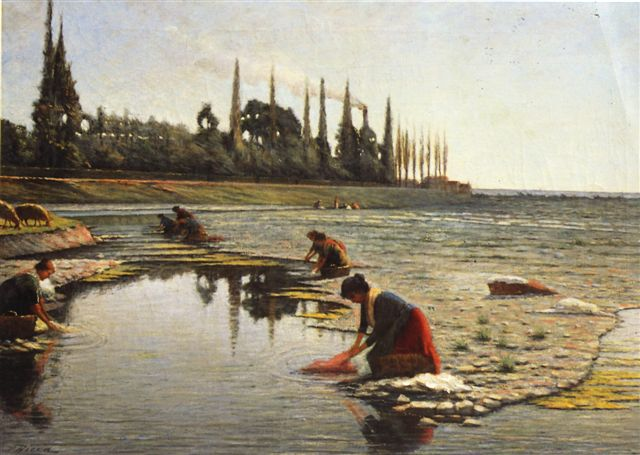
A painting by Pasquale Ricca

Pasquale Ricca (1854–1910) was an Italian painter and sculptor, with an eclectic output of portraits, genre, still-life, seascape, and landscape subjects.

Ricca was born in Civezza. He studied in Florence and worked for a time in Rome and Nizza, but lived most of his adult life in Porto Maurizio, in Liguria. Ricca did a large amount of his work based in the Ligurian Riviera. In 1883 at the National Exhibition of Fine Arts of Rome, he exhibited Passeggiata and Nevicata; in 1884 at Turin, he sent, Acquasantiera di San Pietro at Rome and Tralci con uva.

In 1902, Pasquale Ricca was introduced into public service when he was appointed Conservator of Monuments and Objects of Art and Antiquities for Porto Maurizio.
