= Giuseppe Bonolis =

Italian painter (1800–1851)

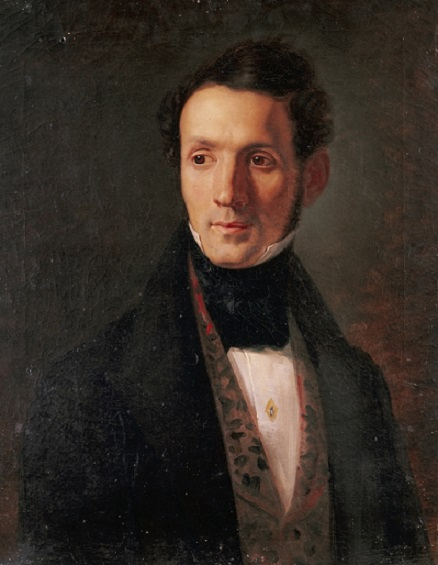
Self-portrait (c.1835)

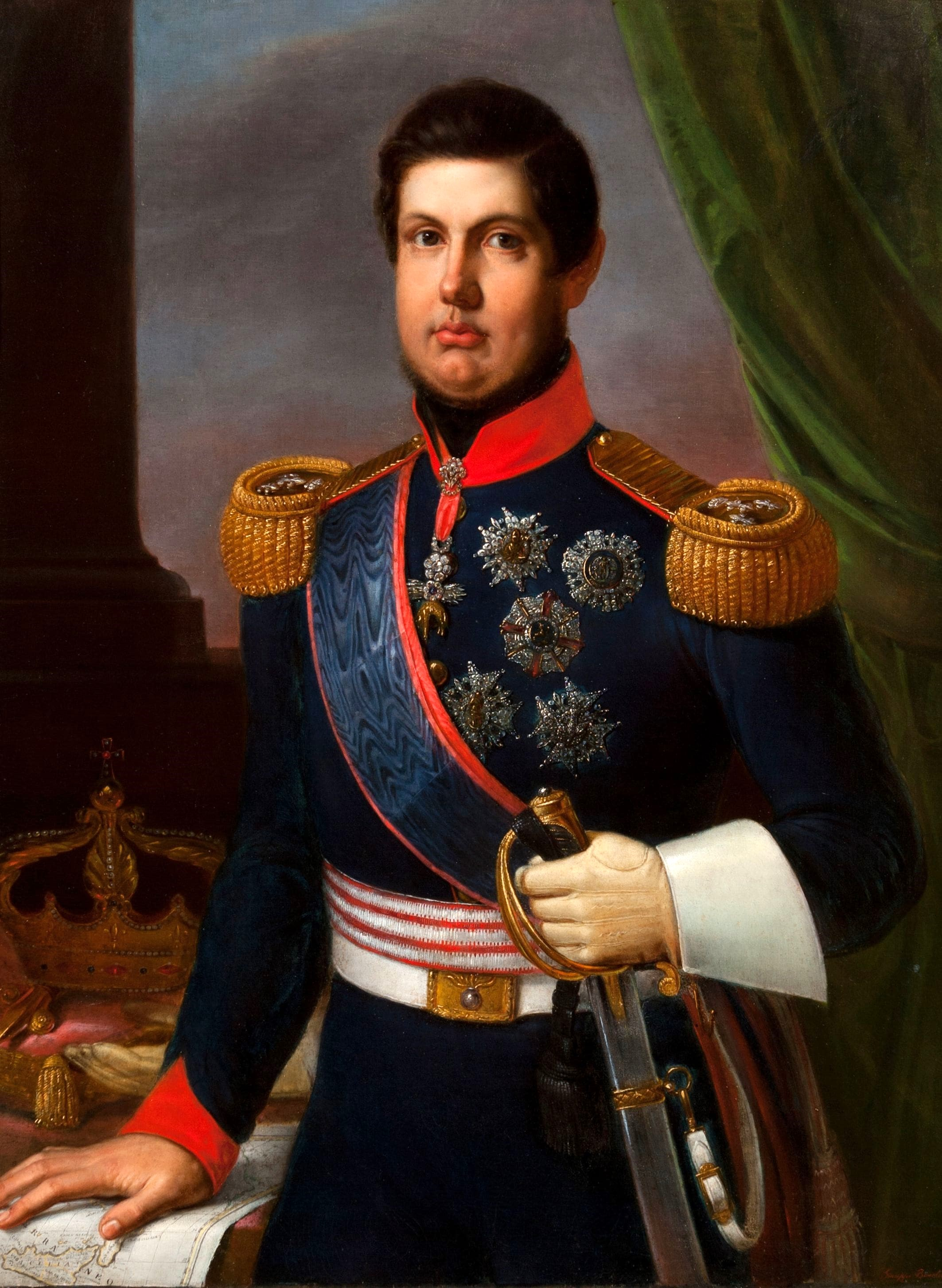
Portrait of King Ferdinand II

Giuseppe Bonolis (January 1, 1800 – April 2, 1851) was an Italian painter, known for his portraits and historical canvases.

== Biography ==
He first trained with Muzio Muzii in Teramo, the city of his birth. He taught Calligraphy in the Royal College of Teramo, but in 1820 he was dismissed because he was suspected of seditious Carboneria connections. He moved to Naples in 1822, where he attended the Academy of Fine Arts, and studied under Giuseppe Cammarano. He became a teacher in various schools in that city. He married in 1832 one of his pupils Adelaide Mazza.

Among his works are a Death of Abel (1837) displayed at the 1837 Exhibition of Fine Arts in Naples. Infancy of Bacchus and Marriage of Bacchus and Ariadne were exhibited both in 1841. Among his other canvases are The four gifts of Poets; an Immaculate Conception for the private chapel of the Marchese Tommasi; St Paul; Solon in the Aereopagus; Coriolanus near the Volsci; and a Charon transporting souls. He painted the Renunciation of the Crown of Naples by Frederick of Naples. He painted an altarpiece of St Bernard, patron of the city, for the Sacristy of the Cathedral of Teramo. Among his portraits are ones of the Prince of Fondi, the Marchese Tommasi of Naples, The Greek Princesses Ipsilanti and Kantakouzene, and Prince Ghica of Moldavia. He also painted self-portraits found at the Pinacoteca of Teramo and of Macerata.

Among his pupils were Achille Vertunni, Filippo Palizzi and Francesco Nétti. He died from typhus in 1851 in Naples, and his burial monument there contains a marble bust by Pasquale Ricca.
