= Pietro Gabrini =

Italian painter

Pietro Gabrini (1856-1926) was an Italian painter known for his landscapes, still lifes, and portraits. He was born in Rome and studied at the Accademia di Belle Arti in Rome, where he was a pupil of the painter Domenico Morelli.

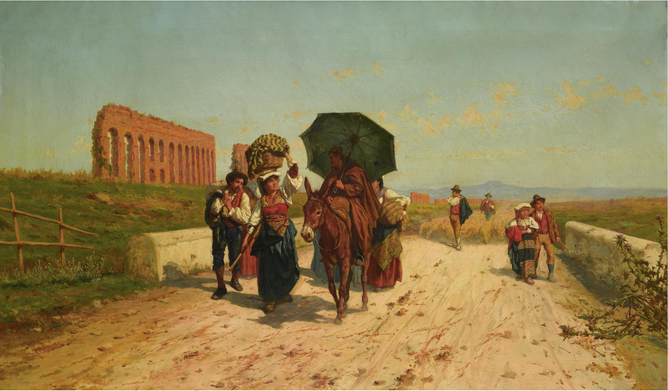
Pietro Gabrini, "Journeying Toward Rome," oil on canvas, 50 x 70 cm, private collection.

== Early life ==
Gabrini was born in Rome in 1856. Gabrini showed an early interest in art and began his studies at the Accademia di Belle Arti in Rome, where he was a pupil of the Neapolitan painter Domenico Morelli.

== Career ==
Gabrini exhibited his work in Italy in the late 19th century, including at the Esposizione di Belle Arti in Rome, where he won a silver medal in 1883. He was a member of the Circolo Artistico in Rome and was involved in the Accademia di San Luca.

Gabrini's work is characterized by his use of light and color, particularly in his landscapes. He often depicted the Roman countryside and its surroundings, portraying scenes of natural beauty with a sense of realism and attention to detail. He also painted still lifes and portraits, known for their simple compositions and use of color.

In 1902 his painting of St. Francis of Assisi debuted in Rome.

Gabrini's work is held in several public collections, including the Galleria Nazionale d'Arte Moderna in Rome and the Museo Civico di Castelnuovo Berardenga. In 2020, a retrospective of his work was held at the Palazzo Braschi in Rome.

== Death ==
Gabrini died in Rome in 1926.
