= Pietro Barucci =

Italian painter (1845–1917)

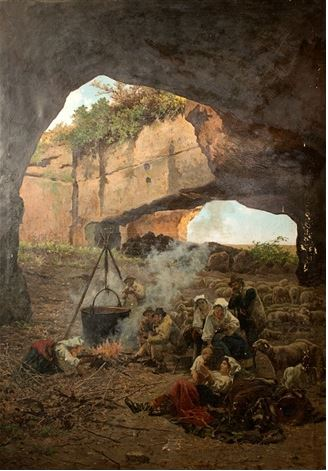
Shepherds Camping in the Ruins

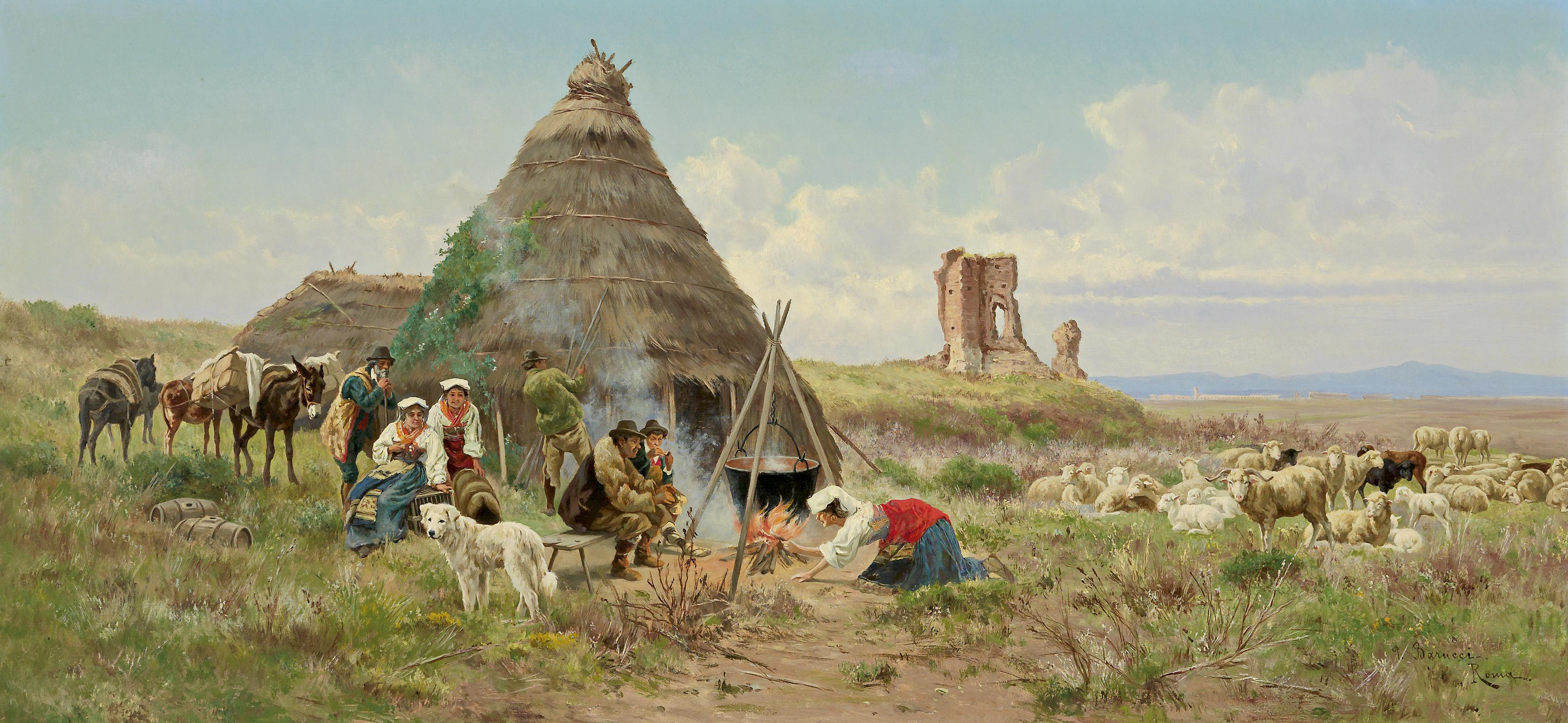
Herders in the Roman Campagna (1917)

Pietro Barucci (20 April 1845 – 23 February 1917) was an Italian painter, mainly of landscapes of rural areas around Rome.

== Biography ==
Born in Rome, he studied at the Accademia di Belle Arti di Roma, where he was a pupil of professor Achille Vertunni. In 1878, he exhibited a landscape at the Accademia and was awarded a medal. He spent most of his career in Rome as a landscape painter; with occasional excursions to the Apennines.

Among his other works are paintings of the Campagna romana; Palude, and Castelfusano, at the exhibition of Belle Arti of Rome in 1883. He also had showings in Chicago in 1893, and at the Salon des Indépendants in Paris in 1907.

He was the grandfather of architect Pietro Barucci.

== Works ==
- Landscape Hood Museum of Art, Dartmouth College, New Hampshire
