= Galleria Comunale d'Arte Moderna, Rome =

Galleria Comunale d'Arte Moderna
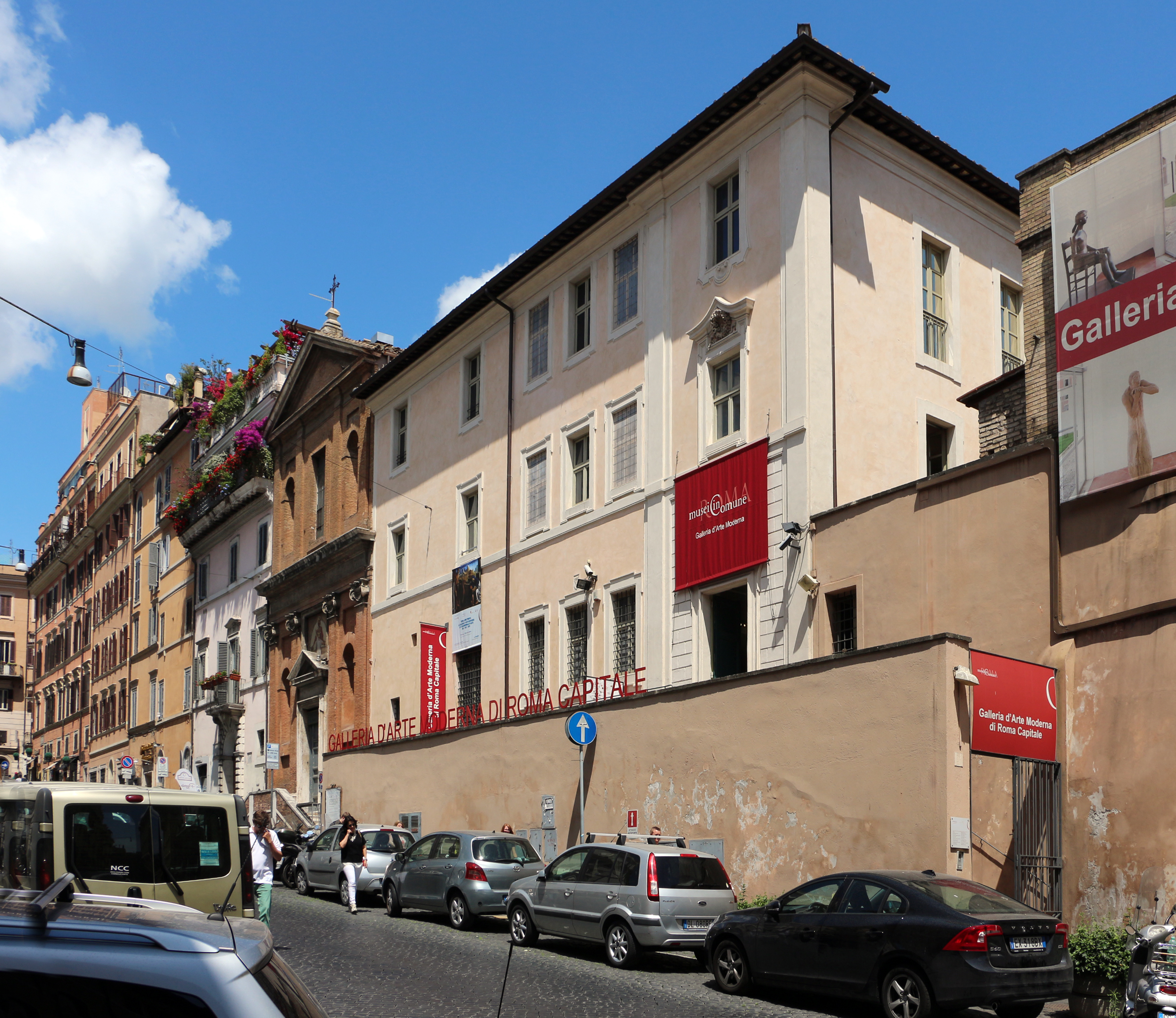
- The Galleria Comunale d'Arte Moderna
- Click on the map for a fullscreen view
- Established: 1883
- Location: Rome
- Coordinates: 41°54′14″N 12°29′09″E
- Type: museum of modern and contemporary art

The Galleria Comunale d'Arte Moderna is the museum of modern and contemporary art of the city of Rome, Italy. It is housed in a former Barefoot Carmelite monastery dating from the 17th century and adjacent to the church of San Giuseppe a Capo le Case, at 24 Via Francesco Crispi.

== History ==
The origins of the collection of the museum date from a purchase by the comune of Rome of works from the Esposizione Internazionale di Belle Arti, or international fine art exhibition, of 1883. The museum was officially constituted in 1925. It was renamed "Galleria Mussolini" in 1931, closed in 1938 and re-opened in 1949. In 1995 it moved to the present premises. It was closed for restoration in 2003, and re-opened in 2011.

In 2014 an expansion of the gallery between via Francesco Crispi and via Zucchelli was proposed, on waste land used by the Azienda Municipale Ambiente, the municipal rubbish disposal utility.

== Collections ==
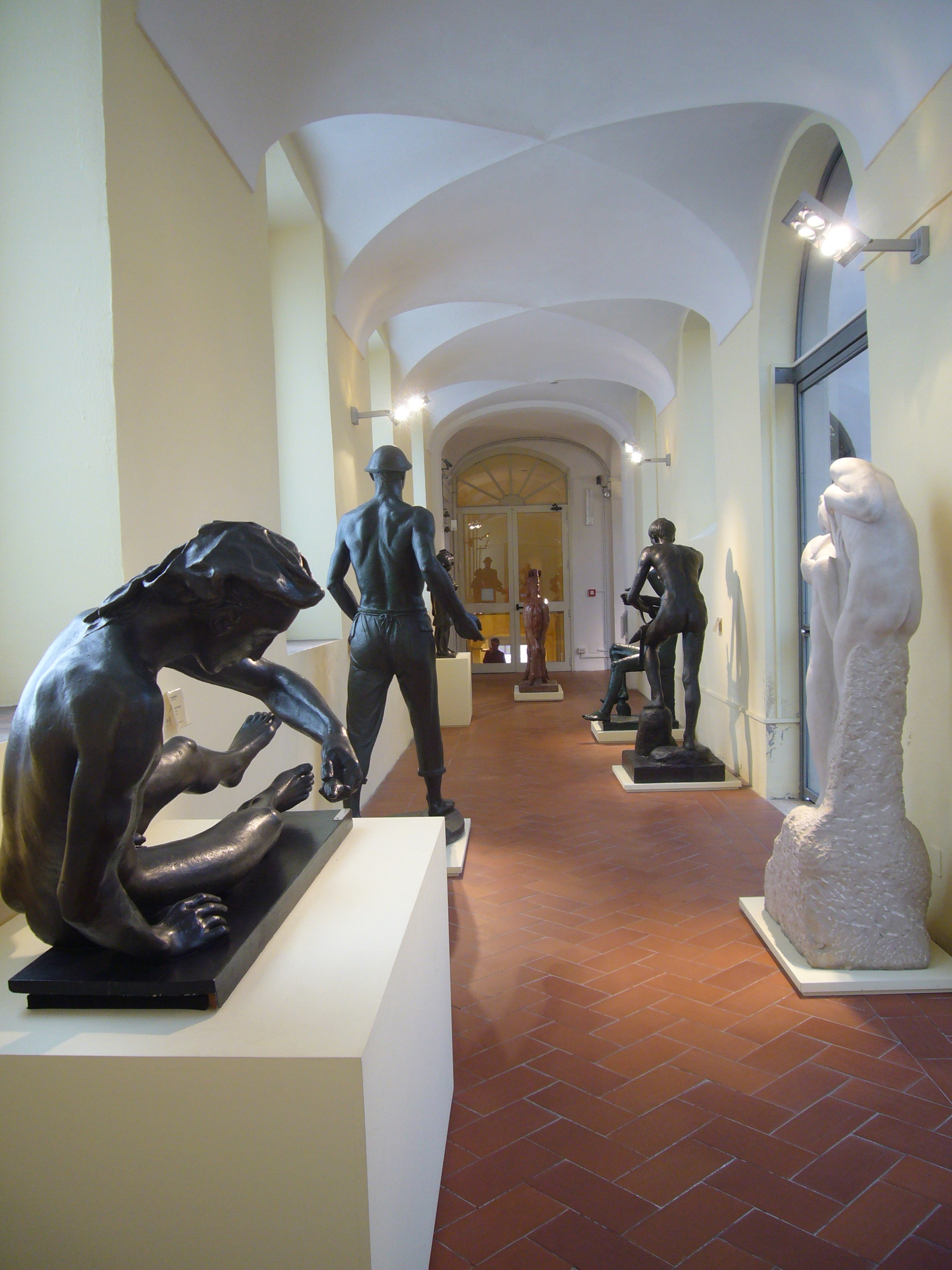
The sculpture gallery of the Galleria Comunale d'Arte Moderna

The gallery contains more than 3000 sculptures, paintings and graphic works of the late 19th century and the early 20th century, by artists including Giacomo Balla, Carlo Carrà, Arturo Dazzi, Giorgio de Chirico, Renato Guttuso, Giacomo Manzù and Giorgio Morandi.

Preceded by Galleria Borghese	Landmarks of Rome; Galleria Comunale d'Arte Moderna, Rome	Succeeded by Galleria Nazionale d'Arte Antica
