= Attilio Simonetti =

Italian painter (1843–1925)

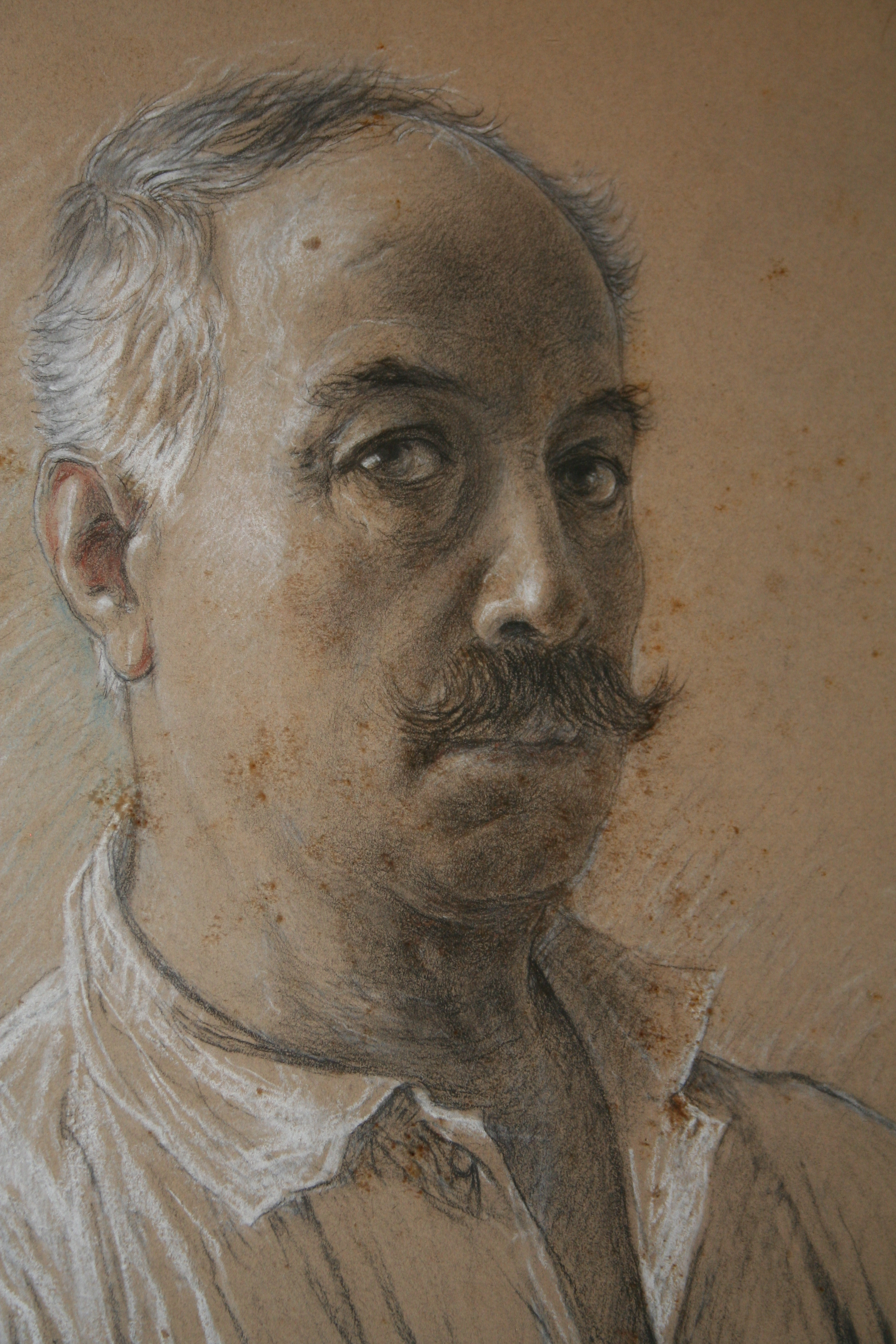
- Self-portrait
- Born: 13 April 1843; Rome
- Died: 14 January 1925 (aged 81); Rome

Attilio Simonetti (1843–1925) was an Italian painter and Antiquarian.

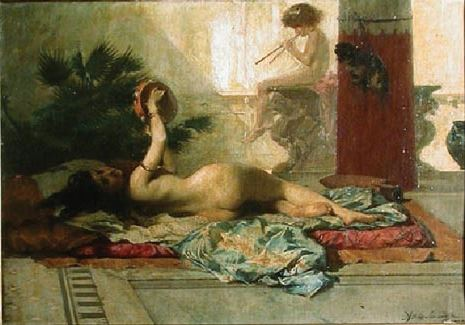
Pompeian Actress

== Biography ==
He was born and resided mainly in Rome: a son of Francesco, a Roman jeweler and engraver, and Carolina née Raffaeli, from a family of mosaicists. He showed a talent for art at an early age, which brought him to the attention of a family friend, the painter Marià Fortuny. At the age of sixteen, he began his formal studies.

In 1868, Simoneti submitted two paintings to an exhibition at the Brera of Milan: Interior of Kitchen at Trastevere and Gate at via dei Carbonari. At the 1877, Neapolitan Esposizione Nazionale di Belle Arti, he displayed a copy of the paintings "L'araldo" and "Il tamburino", which were purchased by the soon-to-be King, Umberto I. While in Naples, he made friends with and was encouraged by Filippo Palizzi, who invited him to exhibit in Campania.

In 1875, he was one of the founders of the Associazione degli Acquarellisti romani (Association of Watercolorists), of which he was an active member until 1883. He also served as executor for the sale of antiquarian objects collected by his old friend, Fortuny, who had died in 1874. This would encourage him to establish his own antiques business.

Among his works: After the Dance; exhibited in 1877 in Naples: Un araldo; Un tamburo; Ogni speranza è morta; Via Giuseppe Mancinelli in Palazzuolo Castracelo.

He also exhibited at the 1883 Mostra of Fine Arts in Rome: some paintings and watercolors, including A governor; Gioia materna; and La filatrice. He also had a good relationship with Adolphe Goupil of the Goupil Gallery of Paris, famed for his patronage of impressionism.

In 1904, he purchased the Palazzo Odescalchi Simonetti in Via Vittoria Colonna, which became his studio and headquarters for his business. His clients included John Pierpont Morgan and William Waldorf Astor, who hired him to design and furnish his "Villa Pompeiana" in Sorrento; inspired by the House of the Vettii in Pompeii.

He died in Rome. The Simonetti family continued the antiquarian business.
