= Pio Joris =

Italian painter

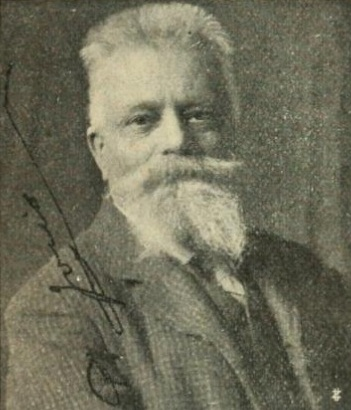
Pio Joris (before 1908)

Pio Joris (8 June 1843 – 6 March 1921) was an Italian painter, engraver and watercolorist.

== Biography ==
Pio Joris was born in Rome and attended the Istituto di Belle Arti as a child. In 1861, he enrolled at the Accademia di San Luca, where he remained for just a year. On a visit to the 1st Esposizione Nazionale di Belle Arti of Florence in 1861, he was attracted by the naturalistic works from the Naples school.

He came into contact with Domenico Morelli and Filippo Palizzi during a trip to Capri, Sorrento and Naples in 1866. In Rome, he kept company with Mariano Fortuny, whose painting made a very strong impression on Joris. That was how he developed his own very personal artistic language, which went on to bring him commercial success on an international scale, helped by his collaboration with Paris art dealer Alphonse Goupil.

During the 1870s, Joris travelled around Europe: his presence is documented in London, Paris and Spain. He reached the peak of his success between the 1880s and 1890s, winning numerous public awards with an anecdotal style of history painting and with genre scenes, shown at the main exhibitions in Italy and abroad. He was awarded the gold medal and the Légion d’Honneur at the Paris Salon in 1900 for two works on a religious theme, reminiscent of studies by his contemporary, Francesco Paolo Michetti. He died in Rome in 1921.

== Selected paintings ==
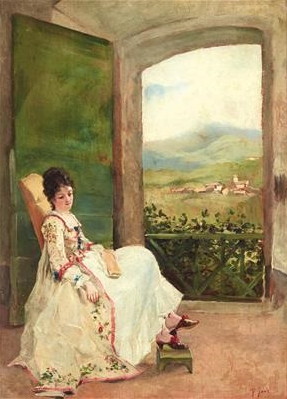
The Daydream

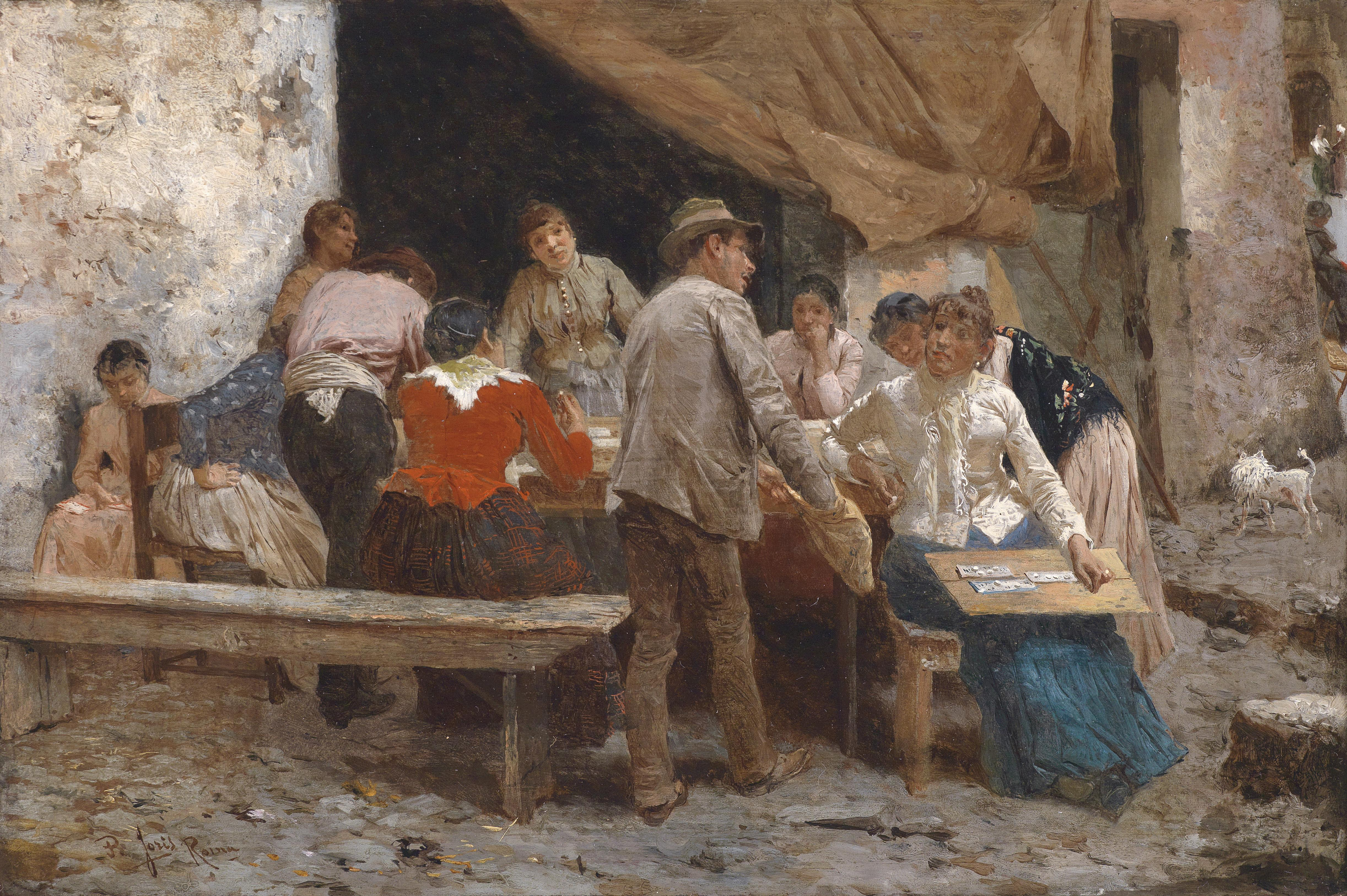
The Card Reader

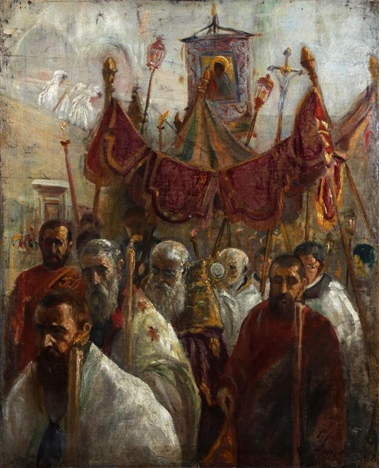
Procession in Assisi

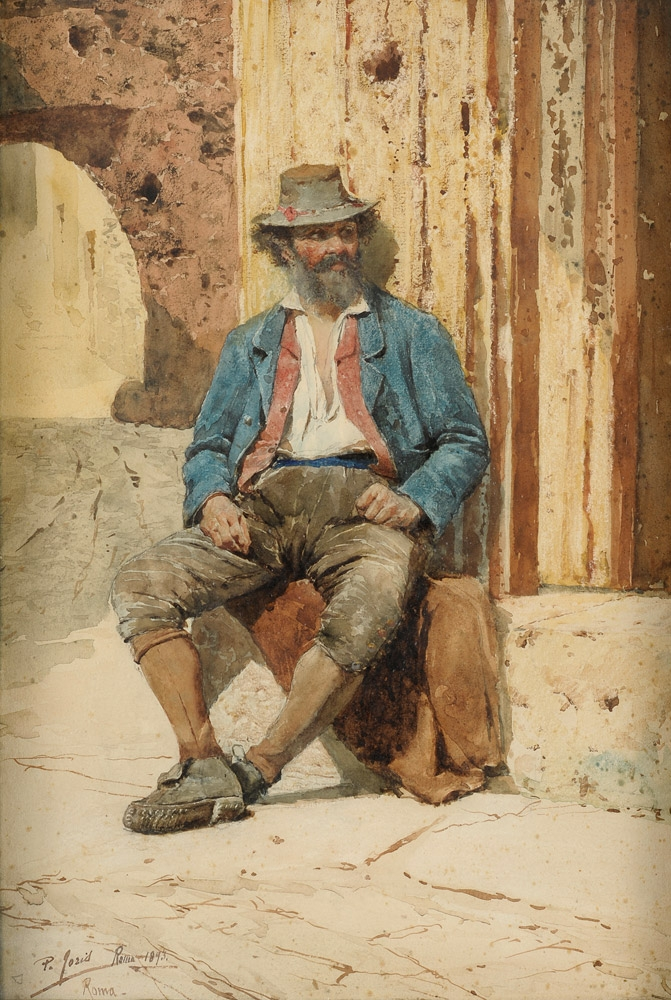
The Siesta, 1893, watercolor

== Sources ==
- Elena Lissoni, Pio Joris, online catalogue Artgate by Fondazione Cariplo, 2010, CC BY-SA (source for the first revision of this article).
- Monica Vinardi, Biography from the Dizionario Biografico degli Italiani @ Treccani
- Matteo Piccioni, "Pio Joris (1843-1921) e la pittura a Roma nel secondo Ottocento", in Storia dell'arte, #128, 2011, 122-148
