= Braschi =

Braschi may refer to:

- Braschi family, an Italian noble family
- Giannina Braschi, American poet
- Nicoletta Braschi, Italian actress
- Gianluigi Braschi, Italian film producer
- Rómulo Antonio Braschi, Argentine Independent Catholic bishop,
- Luigi Braschi Onesti, nephew of Pope Pius VI, from 1787 and 1795 he built Palazzo Braschi at Terracina (a private residence for his uncle)
- Romoaldo Braschi-Onesti, nephew of Pope Pius VI and Camerlengo of the Holy Roman Church from 1800 to 1801.

== See also ==
- 31605 Braschi
- Palazzo Braschi
