= Luigi Braschi Onesti =

Italian nobleman (1745–1816)

Luigi Braschi-Onesti
- Duke of Nemi, Prince of Rocca Sinibalda, Marquess of Belmonte Sabino, Count of Falcino, Marquess and Count Braschi-Onesti, Grandee of Spain 1st Class, Prince of the Holy Roman Empire
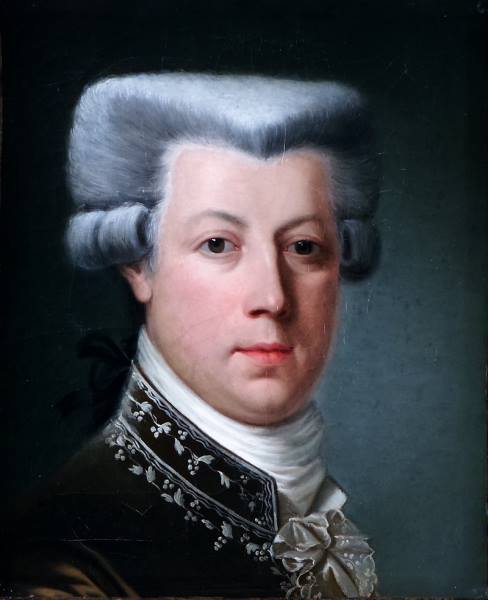
- Born: 19 July 1745; Cesena, Papal States
- Died: February 9, 1816; Rome, Papal States
- Noble family: Braschi-Onesti
- Spouse: Costanza Falconieri
- Father: Girolamo Onesti
- Mother: Elena Giulia Francesca Braschi

Don Luigi Braschi-Onesti (19 July 1745 – 9 February 1816), 1st Duke of Nemi, 1st Prince of Rocca Sinibalda, 1st Marquess of Belmonte Sabino, Count of Falcino, Marquess and Count Braschi-Onesti, Grandee of Spain 1st Class, 1st Prince of the Holy Roman Empire, was a nephew of Pope Pius VI, who granted him his Dukedom, Marquessdom and Countdom.

== Life and family ==
Son of Girolamo Onesti (Cesena, 22 February 1708 - Cesena, 3 April 1790), Marquess and Count Onesti, and wife (23 December 1737) Elena Giulia Francesca Braschi of the Counts of Falcino (Cesena, 28 July 1719 - 16 January 1792), Pope Pius VI's sister, his younger brothers were Filippo Braschi-Onesti and Romoaldo Braschi-Onesti, Cardinal (the penultimate cardinal-nephew) and Camerlengo. His sisters were Anna Teresa Braschi-Onesti, Fulvia Braschi-Onesti, Nun under the name Benedetta, and Marianna Braschi-Onesti (1742), who married Giovanni Bandi. His step-great-grandmother was Countess Cornelia Zangari Bandi. His granduncle was Cardinal Giovanni Carlo Bandi.

On Luigi's marriage, arranged and celebrated by his uncle, to the richest lady of the Falconieri family, Costanza Falconieri, later Dame of the Royal Order of Noble Ladies of Queen Maria Luisa, born in Rome around 1764 or in 1767, daughter of Mario Falconieri, Marquess Falconieri, and wife Giulia Mellini, at the Sistine Chapel in Rome on 31 May or 9 June 1781, he was adopted with his brother and was granted permission and necessary funds by Pius to build Palazzo Braschi off Piazza Navona, and from 1787 and 1795 he built another neoclassical Palazzo Braschi at Terracina, as a private residence for his uncle.

The Frangipani family possessed the Marquessdom of Nemi, which was bought by Pope Pius VI for his nephew Luigi, whom he cumulated with honours and riches, as well as his Cardinal brother. He was created 1st Prince of the Holy Roman Empire by Joseph II, Holy Roman Emperor, in 1782, Grandee of Spain 1st Class by Charles III of Spain and 1st Duke of Nemi, 1st Marquess of Belmonte Sabino and Count of Falcino by his uncle Pope Pius VI on 14 November 1786 and Knight of the Order of Saints Maurice and Lazarus by Victor Amadeus III of Sardinia and Knight of the Order of the Holy Spirit by Louis XVI of France.

On 21 January 1782 Marquess Amanzio Lepri left in his will all his fiefdoms, including Rocca Sinibalda, to Pope Pius VI with the condition that he left as his heir his nephew Luigi Braschi-Onesti. In 1802, Marianna Lepri, Amanzio's niece, challenged the validity of the claim of the will and promoted a lawsuit against the Braschi, with a process authorized by Pius VI, and concluded a compromise with which the inheritance is divided between Luigi, the Pope's nephew - who received part of the fiefdom -, and Marianna Lepri, who received the castle. The Treaty of Concord was laid out on 16 October 1802, with the approval of the Pope. Thus, after 20 years of usurpation by Luigi Braschi-Onesti, the castle passed to Marianna Lepri. During the aforementioned 20 years, Luigi Braschi-Onesti also boasted the title of Prince of Rocca Sinibalda. It is known that, around 1785, Vincenzo Monti was a guest of the castle. In 1816, the castle was property of Alessandro Curti-Lepri, father of Luigi's daughter-in-law, while in 1843 the owner was Marquess Ferdinando Lorenzana.

He was a Senator of Bologna.

The construction on his Rome palazzo was suspended from 15 February 1798 to 1802, during the Roman Republic and the Napoleonic occupation of the city, when the French occupied the house and confiscated the recently acquired antiquities Braschi-Onesti had housed there. Braschi-Onesti moved into the palazzo on 17 May 1809, when Napoleon declared Rome an imperial city within the First French Empire, and was declared Sindaco of Rome between 17 May 1809 and 1814, though the palazzo was still unfinished at his death seven years later.

Between 1814 and 9 February 1816 he was the 2nd Commander of the Papal Noble Guard.

== Issue ==
His children were:

- Don ... Braschi-Onesti (1787 - 1787)
- Doña Giulia Braschi-Onesti (1793 - 1846), married Bonaccorso Flavio Bonaccorsi, Count of Castel San Pietro, and had issue
- Don Pio Braschi-Onesti (Cesena/Rome, 5 June 1804 - Rome, 11 February 1864), 2nd Duke of Nemi, 2nd Marquess of Belmonte Sabino, Count of Falcino, Marquess and Count Braschi-Onesti, 1st Duke of Nemi Grandee of Spain 1st Class by Ferdinand VII of Spain on 6 September 1828, 2nd Prince of the Holy Roman Empire, married in Rome on 3 June 1841 as her second husband Maria Anna Curti-Lepri of the Marquesses Curti-Lepri (Cesena, 1803 - 1879), daughter of Alessandro Curti-Lepri, Marquess Curti-Lepri (1799 - 30 May 1870), and wife (Rome, 7 January 1828) Cecilia Bernini of the Knights Bernini (Rome, 3 September 1810 - 14 August 1855), and had:
  - Doña Costanza Braschi-Onesti (21 October 1843 - ?), married Francesco Zucchini, Count Zucchini, son of Gian Carlo Zucchini, Count Zucchini, Noble of Bologna, and brother of Gaetano Zucchini, 1st Count Zucchini by Pope Pius IX in 1850, Noble of Bologna, one of six children of Giuseppe Zucchini, Noble of Bologna on 17 June 1836 (1766 - 1837) (son of a tailor of Baricella), and wife (1792) Annunziata Pallotti, and had:
    - Matilde Zucchini, Noble of Bologna (Poggio Renatico, 28 July 1867 - 25 April 1933), married in Bologna on 4 November 1900 Carlo Berti (Modena, 1859 - San Lazzaro di Sàvena, 5 September 1918), Sindaco of San Lazzaro di Sàvena from 1897 to 1914, son of Giovan/Gian Gaetano Berti, Sindaco of San Lazzaro di Sàvena, and wife Clementina Bersani, without issue
  - Don Romoaldo or Romualdo Braschi-Onesti (Cesena, 22 February/April 1849 - 14 June 1923), 3rd Duke of Nemi, 3rd Marquess of Belmonte Sabino, Count of Falcino, Marquess and Count Braschi-Onesti, 3rd Prince of the Holy Roman Empire, married in Montevideo on 5 August 1882 Angela Manuelita called Emmanuelita Calcagno of the Barons Calcagno (Montevideo, 18 December 1859 - 1926), and had:
    - Doña Giulia Anna Maria Costanza Braschi-Onesti (Genova, 27 August 1883 - Rome, 8 April 1957), married in Zola Predosa on 19 October 1911 Clemente Theodoli (Rome, 6 November 1878 - Bologna, 26 September 1956), son of Girolamo Theodoli, Marquess of Sambuci of the Marquesses of San Vito and Pisoniano and Counts of Ciciliano (Rome, 25 December 1846 - Rome, 28 May 1926), and wife (Rome, 2 February 1873) Cristina Anna Maria Altieri, of the Princes Altieri, Princes of Oriolo, Princes of Aviano/Viano, Dukes of Monterano, etc. (Rome, 12 April 1852 - Rome, 16 June 1930), and had:
      - Don Pio Theodoli (Zola Predosa, 1 September 1912 - Bologna, 7 March 1999), married in Bologna on 28 April 1940/30 April 1941 Adriana Moscatelli (Rome, 7 October 1921 - Rome, 22 September 2008), daughter of Giuseppe Moscatelli, Vice-Commander of the Arm of the Carabinieri, and wife, and had:
        - Don Giovanni Angelo Theodoli-Braschi (Bologna, 1 May 1942), 2nd Duke of Nemi Grandee of Spain by Juan Carlos I of Spain on 27 December 1990, married firstly in Rome in 1970 and divorced in 1975 Giada, Princess Ruspoli (Rome, 8 March 1949), daughter of Sforza Marescotto, Prince Ruspoli of the Princes Ruspoli and Princes of Cerveteri (Rome, 23 January 1927 - Rome, 25 October 2022) and first wife (Migliarino, 30 November 1946 (divorced in 1983) Flavia Domitilla of the Dukes Salviati (Rome, 28 April 1925 - Migliarino Pisano, 6 April 2007), without issue, and married secondly in London on 26 February 1977 Maria Bernadette Milstein (New York, New York, New York, 11 March 1946), daughter of Nathan Mironovich Milstein (Odessa, 18/31 December 1903 - London, 21 December 1992), violinist, and wife (1945) Therese Kaufman (15 July 1915 - New York, New York County, New York, 9 June 1999), and paternal granddaughter of Miron Milstein, merchant in Odessa, importer of fabrics, and wife Marija Bluestein, Ukrainian Jews, and had:
          - Doña Costanza (Cosi) Nicoletta Theodoli-Braschi (London, 7 June 1982), married in New York, New York County, New York, on 27 June 2014 Adam Akio Crystal (Alameda County, California, 25 September 1976), son of Eric J. Crystal, American Jew, and wife Hatsumi Catherine Nomura, Japanese American, and has issue, one daughter and one son
          - Don Stefano Marcello Theodoli-Braschi (London, 30 May 1985), married civilly on 27 July 2024 George Williamson, without issue
      - Don Marcello Theodoli-Braschi (22 August 1915 - 10 January 1981), who added the surname Braschi by Decree of the President of the Italian Republic of 16 October 1954, unmarried and without issue
  - Doña Angela Luigia Braschi-Onesti (1885 - 1887)

== Collection ==
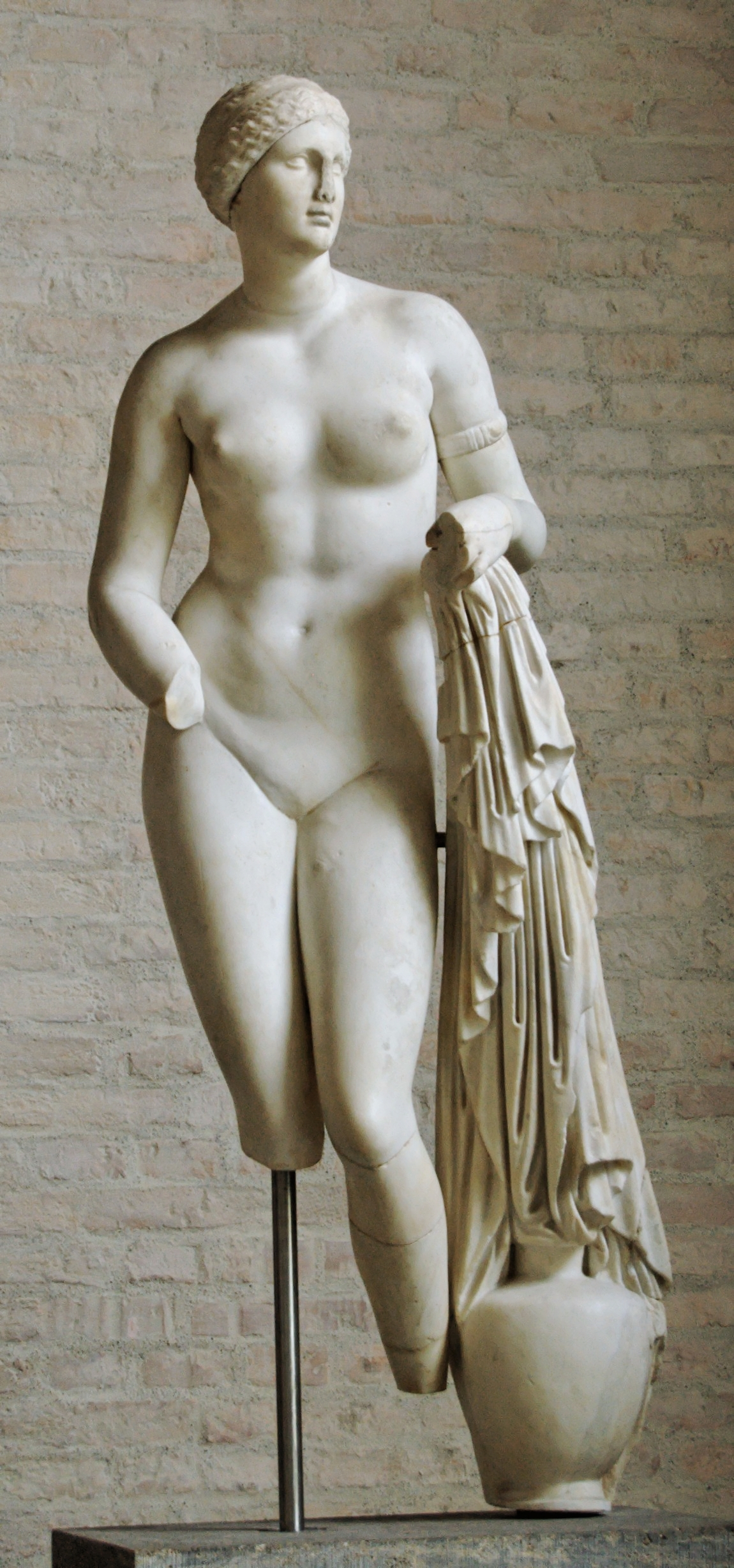
The "Braschi Venus" from the Villa of the Quintilii, sold in 1811 (Glyptothek, Munich)

Some of his antiquities were purchased by the Crown Prince of Bavaria, later King Ludwig I and are conserved at the Glyptothek that he built in Munich.

The Braschi collection included:

- Esquilache Immaculate Conception by Bartolomé Esteban Murillo (Now in the Hermitage Museum)
- Mystical Marriage of Saint Catherine by Beccafumi (Now in the Hermitage Museum)
- Equestrian portrait of Francisco de Moncada by Anthony van Dyck (Now in the Louvre Museum)
- Christ Driving the Merchants from the Temple by Bartolomeo Manfredi (Now in the Fine Arts Museum of Libourne)
- The Madonna and child with Saint Anne and the infant saint John the Baptist by a follower of Raphael
- Self portrait by Andrea del Sarto (Now in Alnwick Castle)
- Statues of Otho, Severus Alexander, Antinous, Cybele, Asclepius, Faustina the Elder and Faustina the Younger (Now in the Louvre Museum)
- Sculpture of a Child and Goose by Boethus of Chalcedon (Now in the Louvre Museum)
- Statue of Lucius Verus (Now in a British private collection)
- The Braschi Antinous (Now in the Vatican Museums)
- Venus Braschi, Artemis Braschi (Now in the Glyptothek, Munich)
