= Zangari =

Zangari is an Italian surname derived from medieval Greek tzankarēs, tsangarios (bootmaker). Notable people with the surname include:

- Cornelia Zangari Bandi (1664–1731), Italian noblewoman
- Guy Zangari, Australian politician
- James Zangari, American politician
