= Monument to Marco Minghetti =

Memorial in Rome

Coordinates: 41.89699°N 12.47280°E

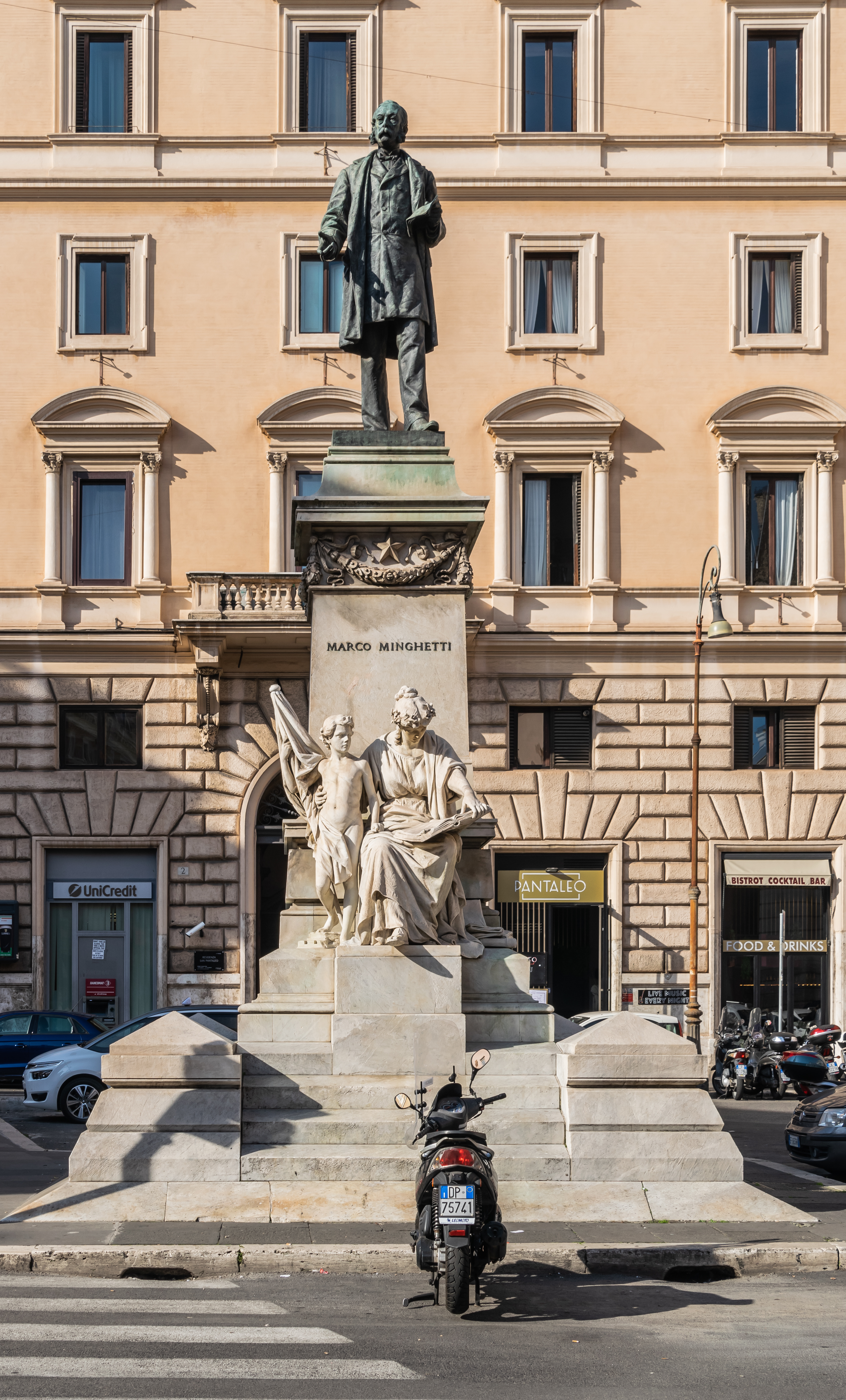
- Interactive map of Monument to Marco Minghetti
- Location: Rome, Italy
- Designer: Lio Gangheri, Giacomo Misuraca
- Type: Statue
- Material: Bronze
- Dedicated date: September 1895
- Dedicated to: Marco Minghetti

The Monument to Marco Minghetti is a memorial statue dedicated to the statesman Marco Minghetti (1818-1886); it is located along the Corso Vittorio Emanuele, at Piazza San Pantaleo (Piazza di Palazzo Braschi), in Rome, Italy.

Minghetti had served the Kingdom of Italy, at least twice as prime minister, and many years in congress, mainly allied with more conservative factions. His early deliberations had mainly focused on the consolidation of the Italian peninsula into a nation, including the Papal States and Venice. He had begun his career under Count Cavour. After his death, Parliament approved and funded a monument. A commission led by the Marquis Antonio Starrabba of Rudinì, and including the sculptors Emilio Gallori and Ercole Rosa, and the architects Basile and Manfredi, sponsored a competition for the memorial. The initial designs considered by the commission, by Ettore Ximenes and Adolfo Laurenti, were ultimately turned down. A subsequent model was approved in 1888; this one was a design by the sculptor Lio Gangheri and the architect Giacomo Misuraca. At the time, the Palazzo Braschi was home to the Ministry of the Interior and the prime minister's office.

The monument was inaugurated in September 1895. The bronze statue of the standing Minghetti, with a book in hand, rises atop a high plinth. His left hand appears to be making a point. At the base is an allegorical statue putatively representing Politics with a laurel crown and reading books. Beside her is putatively a child, representing the nation, with a flag. On the rear of the monument, an inscription states the monument was decreed by Parliament on the 19 June 1887.
