= Anesi =

Anesi is a surname. Notable people with the surname include:

- Matteo Anesi (born 1984), Italian speed skater
- Paolo Anesi (1697–1773), Italian painter
- Sosene Anesi (born 1981), New Zealand rugby union footballer
