= Romoaldo Braschi-Onesti =

Roman Catholic cardinal

- Archpriest of the Basilica di San Pietro in Vaticano
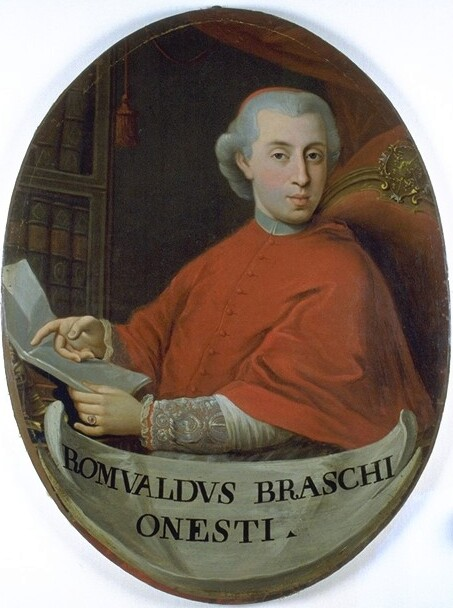
- Church: Catholic Church
- See: St. Peter's Basilica
- In office: 18 July 1807 – 30 April 1817
- Predecessor: Henry Benedict Stuart
- Successor: Alessandro Mattei
- Other post: Cardinal-Deacon of Santa Maria ad Martyres (1800-1817)
- Previous posts: Camerlengo of the Apostolic Chamber (1800-1801); Cardinal-Deacon of San Nicola in Carcere (1787-1800)

Orders
- Created cardinal: 18 December 1786 by Pope Pius VI

Personal details
- Born: 19 July 1753 Cesena, Romagna, Papal States
- Died: 30 April 1817 (aged 63) Rome, Papal States

Romoaldo (or Romualdo) Braschi-Onesti (Cesena, 19 July 1753 – Rome, 30 April 1817) was a cardinal of the Roman Catholic Church.

== Life ==
Son of Girolamo Onesti (Cesena, 22 February 1708 - Cesena, 3 April 1790), Marquess and Count Onesti, and wife (23 December 1737) Elena Giulia Francesca Braschi of the Counts of Falcino (Cesena, 28 July 1719 - 16 January 1792), his elder brothers were Luigi Braschi Onesti, who built the Palazzo Braschi in Rome, and Filippo Braschi-Onesti. His sisters were Anna Teresa Braschi-Onesti, Fulvia Braschi-Onesti, Nun under the name Benedetta, and Marianna Braschi-Onesti (1742), who married Giovanni Bandi. His step-great-grandmother was Countess Cornelia Zangari Bandi. His granduncle was Cardinal Giovanni Carlo Bandi.

His uncle, Pope Pius VI, adopted him on 31 May or 9 June 1781, cumulated him with honours and riches along with his brother and made him a cardinal on 18 December 1786, making him the penultimate cardinal-nephew to date (in the narrow sense of a Pope appointing his nephew, the last one being Gabriele della Genga Sermattei, nephew of Pope Leo XII; if "cardinal-nephew" can mean any close relative, then the last was Giuseppe Pecci, appointed by his younger brother Pope Leo XIII). A month later he became Cardinal-Deacon of San Nicola in Carcere. On 30 October 1800 he became Camerlengo of the Holy Roman Church, until 10 November 1801.

From 1807 until his death, he was Archpriest of St. Peter's Basilica.

Between 1784 and 1817, he was also Grand Prior of Rome of the Sovereign Military Hospitaller Order of Saint John of Jerusalem, of Rhodes and of Malta.

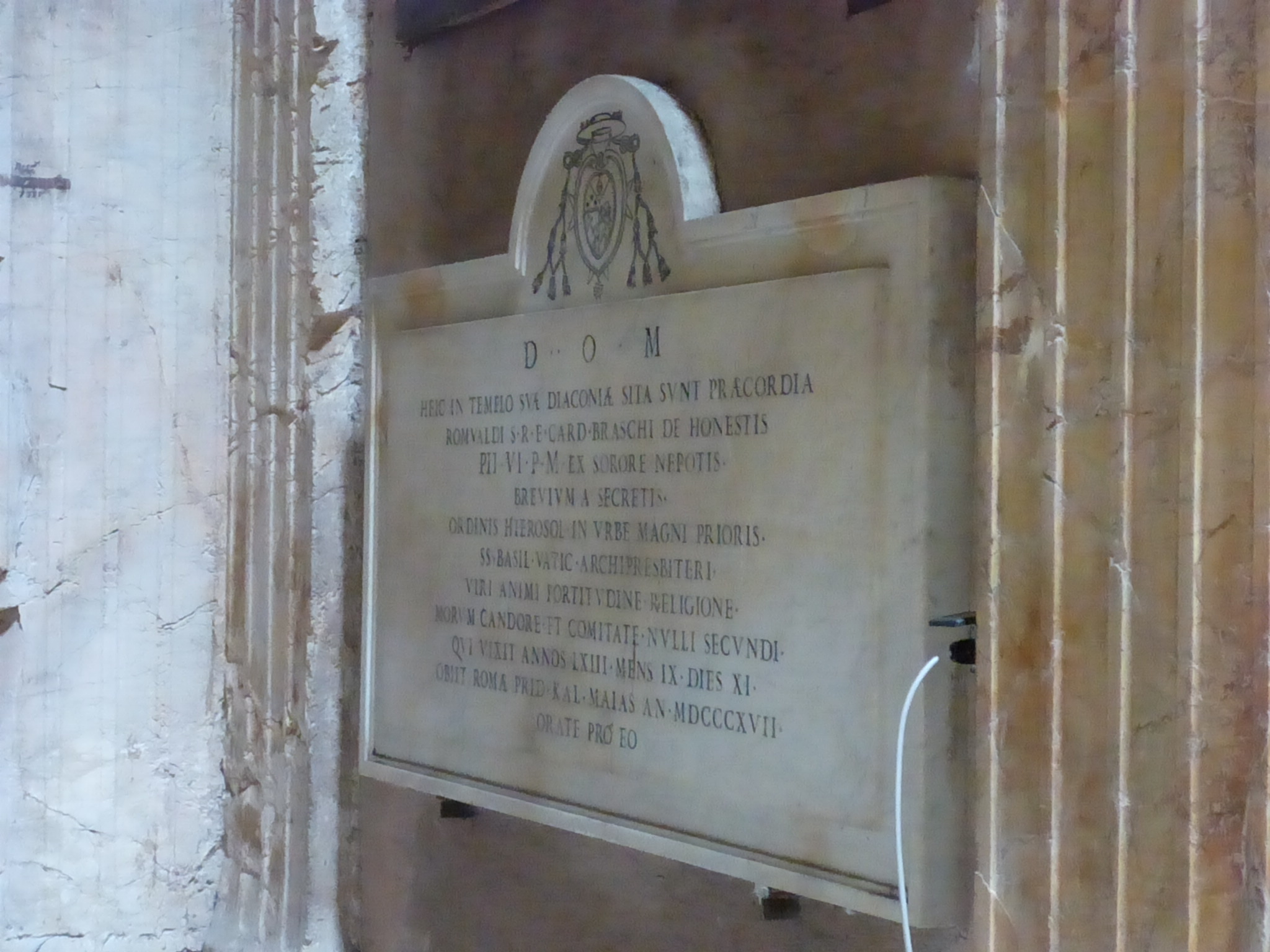
Tombstone for his praecordia in the Pantheon.

At his death, his body was buried in St. Peter's Basilica, while his praecordia were buried in the Chapel of the Madonna of Clemency in the Pantheon.

== See also ==
- Catholic Church in Italy

Catholic Church titles
Preceded by Carlo Rezzonico (iuniore)	Camerlengo of the Holy Roman Church; 1800–1801	Succeeded by Giuseppe Doria Pamphili
