= Bernardino Fergioni =

Italian painter

- Self-portrait, Nationalmuseum, Stockholm
- Born: Bernardino Vincenzo Fergioni; 2 January 1674; Rome, Papal States
- Died: 1738; Rome, Papal States
- Known for: Landscape painting

Bernardino Vincenzo Fergioni (2 January 1674–1738), called Sbirretto, was an Italian painter of marine views and seaports, stated by Lanzi to have flourished in Rome about the year 1718. Adrien Manglard studied with Fergioni in Rome. Claude-Joseph Vernet, too, was welcomed in his atelier sometime after his arrival in Rome in 1732. Among his other pupils were Andrea Locatelli, and Paolo Anesi.

== Biography ==
Fergioni was born in Rome on 2 January 1674, although some dated sources mistakenly report his year of birth as 1675. He was baptized on 9 January, in the no longer extant church of San Nicola degli Incoronati, formerly located close by the Carceri Nuove, in the Regola rione of Rome. His mother, Margherita Bottoni, was from Montegiorgio, nearby Fermo. His father was a sbirro (17th-century policeman) from Sant'Angelo del Pesco. Fergioni's nickname Sbirretto, which is often used to refer to him than his actual surname, derives from his father's profession.

While virtually unknown today, Fergioni was appreciated by his contemporaries. In the late 1710s he was included in the Abecedario pittorico by P. A. Orlandi, who recorded information on the painter given to him by Giuseppe Ghezzi. Fergioni wrote a letter in 1719 to thank Orlandi for his inclusion in the Abecedario (the letter is today in the Archiginnasio of Bologna, manuscript B. 153, n. 82). Another biography, richer in details, on Fargioni was completed by Nicola Pio in 1724.

Fergioni was born to a family of modest means, but was nonetheless able to devote himself to the study of literature, honing his skills as an orator and a poet up to his twenties. Fergioni began to paint for pleasure, seeking advise on the best painting technique among his contemporaries. He started by copying opera of other famous painters, such as Mattia Preti, Giacinto Brandi and Guercino. After meeting German painter Philipp Peter Roos, he started following his style, and thus became an animal painter. Fergioni later started on a journey to Tuscany, sojourning in Siena, where he got a job, and then in Leghorn. There, he studied under an unknown master, Monsù Alto, who imparted on him a more realist and naturalist approach, and allowed him to build himself a repertoire of forms.

He returned to Rome as a marine landscape painter. There he received commissions by the Gabrielli family, as well as by clients from Genoa and Taggia. Probably around 1711, Fergioni painted an Annunziata for the church of San Martino in Faldignano, near Cascia, Umbria. The painting is now lost.

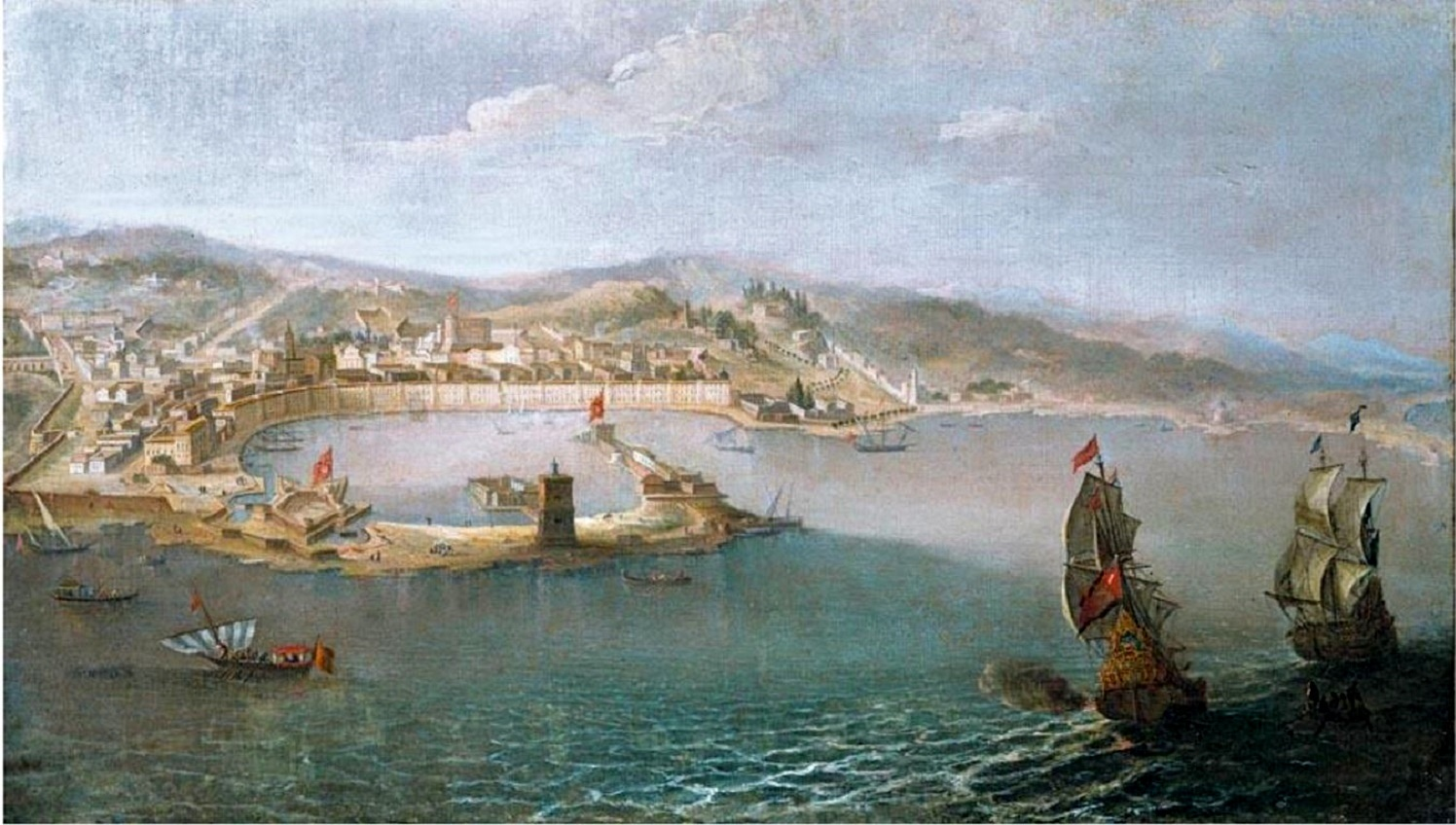
View of Messina, Bernardino Fergioni

Ghezzi exposed paintings by Fergioni at San Salvatore in Lauro, which he considered quite beautiful, on two occasions, in 1716 and 1717. These were a marine view with many figures, property of the Falconieri family, and a view of the harbor of Messina. More paintings by Fergioni are recorded in notarial documents. These include Due grandi marine bislonghe (Arch. di Stato di Roma, 30 Notai capitolini, Office 25, envelope 559), property of Filippo Antonelli in 1732; Una marina (ibid., Office 14, envelope 430), property of Andrea Marilli in 1760; Due piccoli paesini (Ibid., Not. d. Tribunale d. Auditor Camerae, envelope 4392) property of Giuseppe Sardi in 1771.

According to Lanzi, two French painters overshadowed Fergioni's fame in the early 18th century, that is Manglard and Vernet, who arrived in Rome in 1715 and 1734, respectively. According to Lanzi, Vernet was not warmly welcomed in Manglard's studio, and so moved on to Fergioni's before going sur les ports de mer ... faire ses études. However, Vernet probably studied first with Fergioni, to then move to Manglard's.

Fergioni experienced a modest financial success and a more consistent social one in his lifetime. His father bequeathed to him his furniture and about thirty paintings, together with the obligation of providing for his family via his up-and-down job as a painter (Fergioni was given the burden of providing for the family through le di lui industrie e con la di lui virtù e fatiche nella professione di pittore). On the other hand, Fergioni was awarded a Knight Cross by Pope Benedict XIII, which he "flaunted continuously."

Fergioni married Anna Maria Moscatelli on 14 December 1722. The marriage produced no offspring. Fergioni died in Rome in 1738.

== Bibliography ==
- Valesio, Francesco (1978). Diario di Roma, IV [1708-1728]. Milano: Longanesi.

Attribution:
