= Andrea Locatelli =

Italian painter (1695–1741)

- Landscape with a wounded Bandit and other Figures, c. 1725, Oxford, Ashmolean Museum
- Born: 19 December 1695; Rome, Papal States
- Died: 19 February 1741 (aged 45); Rome, Papal States
- Education: Bernardino Fergioni
- Known for: Landscape art
- Style: Baroque
- Movement: Vedutismo

Andrea Locatelli (19 December 1695 – 19 February 1741) was an Italian painter of landscapes (vedute).

== Biography ==
Andrea Locatelli (he spelt it Lucatelli) was born in Rome in 1695, as stated by him at the base of a self-portrait drawing he made for Nicola Pio in 1723. Andrea was the son of Giovanni Francesco Locatelli and not Pietro Locatelli, as has been previously reported. He studied under his father until 1708 and then under Monsù Alto, who specialized in marine scenery. In 1712, he, along with Paolo Anesi, became a student of Bernardino Fergioni, also a marine genre specialist. By 1723, at 28 years old, he was referred to by Pio as a master. He was influenced by Jan Frans van Bloemen, Giovanni Ghisolfi, Gaspard Dughet, Claude Lorrain, and especially Salvator Rosa. In turn he influenced such artists as Paolo Anesi, Giovanni Paolo Panini, Paolo Monaldi, and Marco Ricci.

The subject matter most popular with the academic artists of this time was mainly sacred, historical or mythological themes. Locatelli broke with these traditions and concentrated on landscapes, a genre thought to be inferior by the art critics of his day. In fact, he was never allowed induction into the Accademia di San Luca, a very prestigious mark of honour, even though his work was in great demand. Vici considered that Locatelli was "the essential link in the evolution of European landscape painting during the eighteenth century."

Locatelli was patronized by kings, queens, princes, cardinals and the wealthy, not only in Rome, but also throughout Europe. One family – the Colonna – owned 81 of his paintings. At a time when it was becoming fashionable to make the Grand Tour, his paintings spread widely. Demand caused him to duplicate dozens of nearly identical ones.

Early in his career, Locatelli specialized in romantic notions of the Latium countryside, frequently including improvised architectural elements of columns or buildings. Very few of these are thought to have been actual structures, although some were based on scenes along the Tiber and a well-known view of the Piazza Navona. In later years, he leaned more to "grassy ruins" and countryside expanded with trees, peasants and farm animals being more prominent. Prior to about 1725, his works were considered "ruddy" in tone. A typical composition would contain figures of people or animals in the foreground, with buildings in the midground and mountains or water in the distance. Balancing this horizontal pattern were vertical elements of buildings, columns and trees – especially large oaks or ilex rising up from the foreground. A frequent feature is the presence of broken trees or stumps and Mediterranean shrubbery.

Vici said, "Locatelli’s landscapes are remarkable for the sense of solitude they convey despite the fact that they are populated by figures. There is a sense of seclusion, a quality that induced one to turn from the colourless life of the community to the joy of the isolation of an interiorized existence." He excelled at the combination of a landscape with a peasant scene. He drew inspiration from the Bamboccianti, a group of genre painters – most of them originally Flemish or Dutch – who worked in Rome from about 1625 to the close of the 17th century.

Locatelli incorporated farm animals into some of his paintings and was considered skilled with horses, which became more prominent as his career advanced. In some of his paintings, the figures were painted by specialists.

Locatelli died in debt in 1741 after "a dissolute life".

== Gallery ==
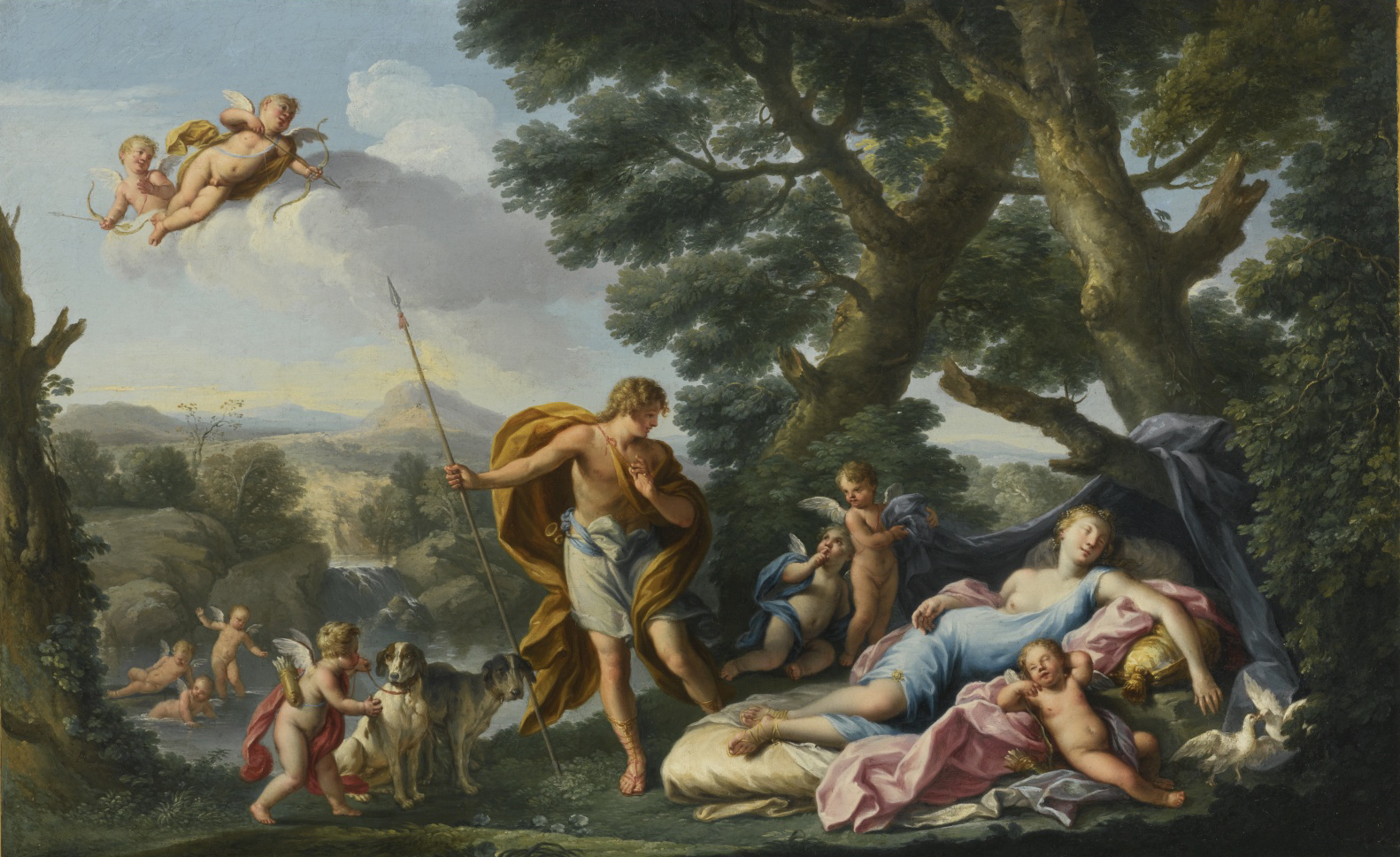
Venus and Adonis, c. 1720, private collection

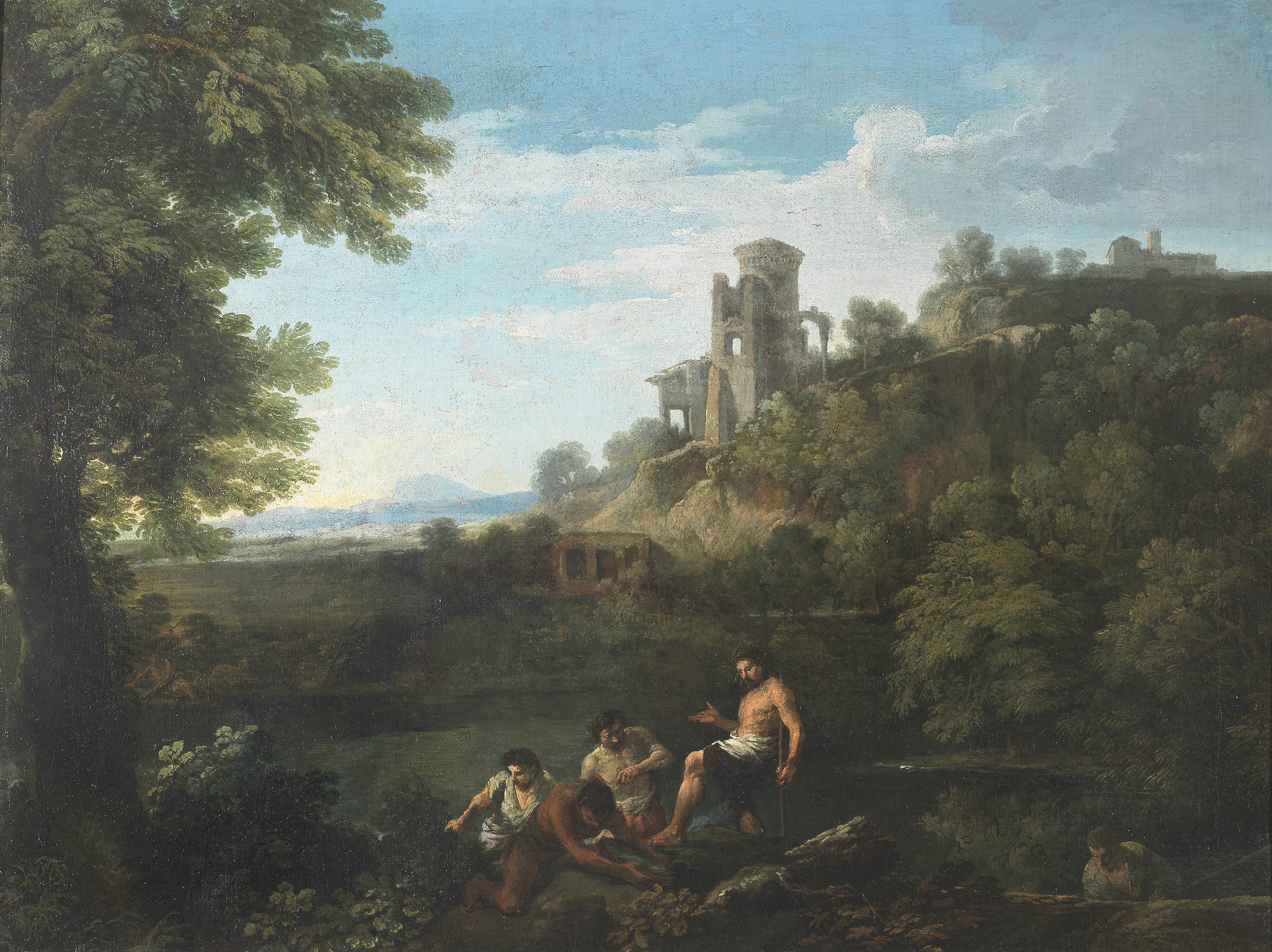
Fishermen, c. 1700, Rome, Collezione Mainetti

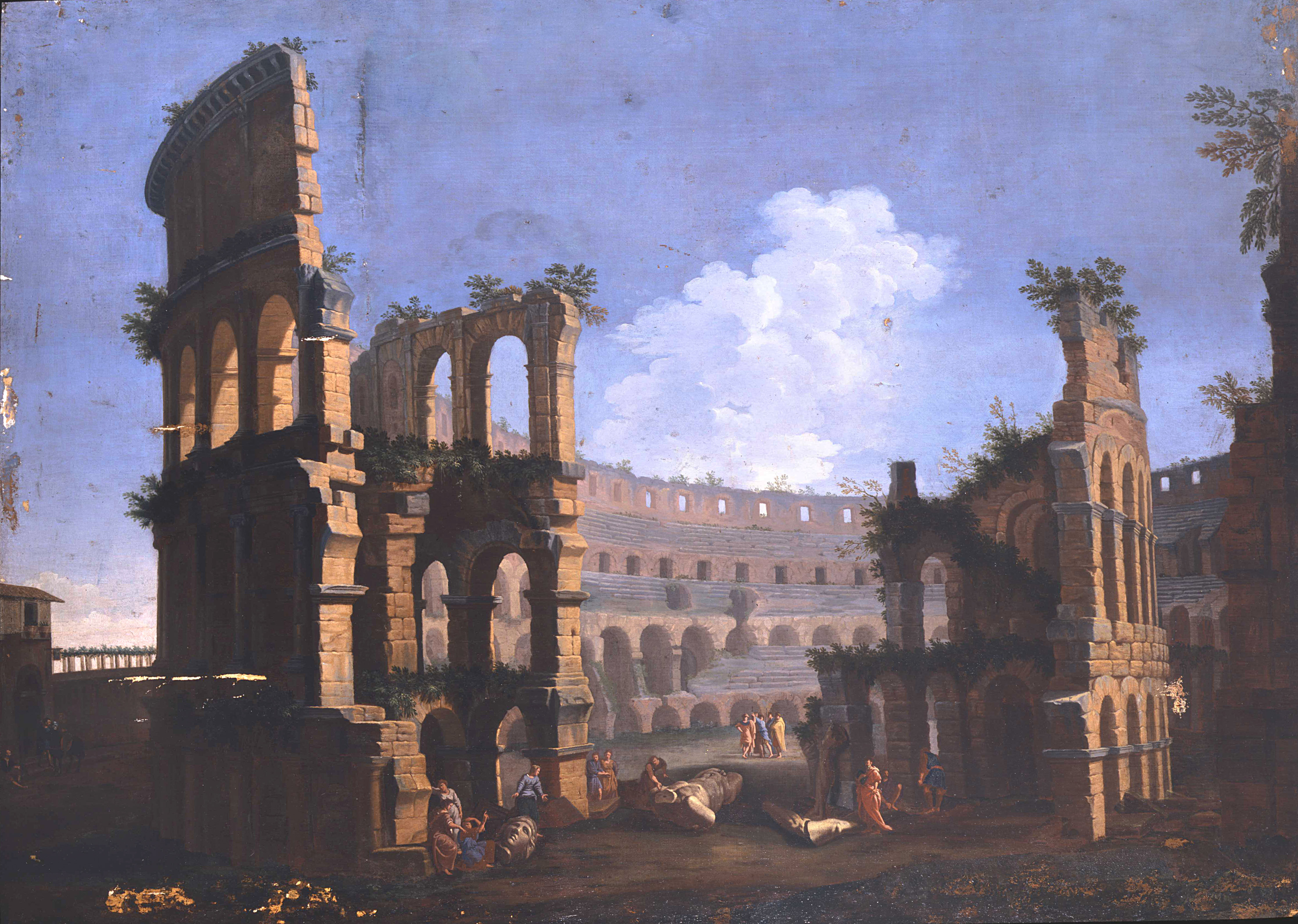
View of the Colosseum, c. 1700, private collection

Tobias and the Angel, c. 1700, Wakefield, The Hepworth Wakefield

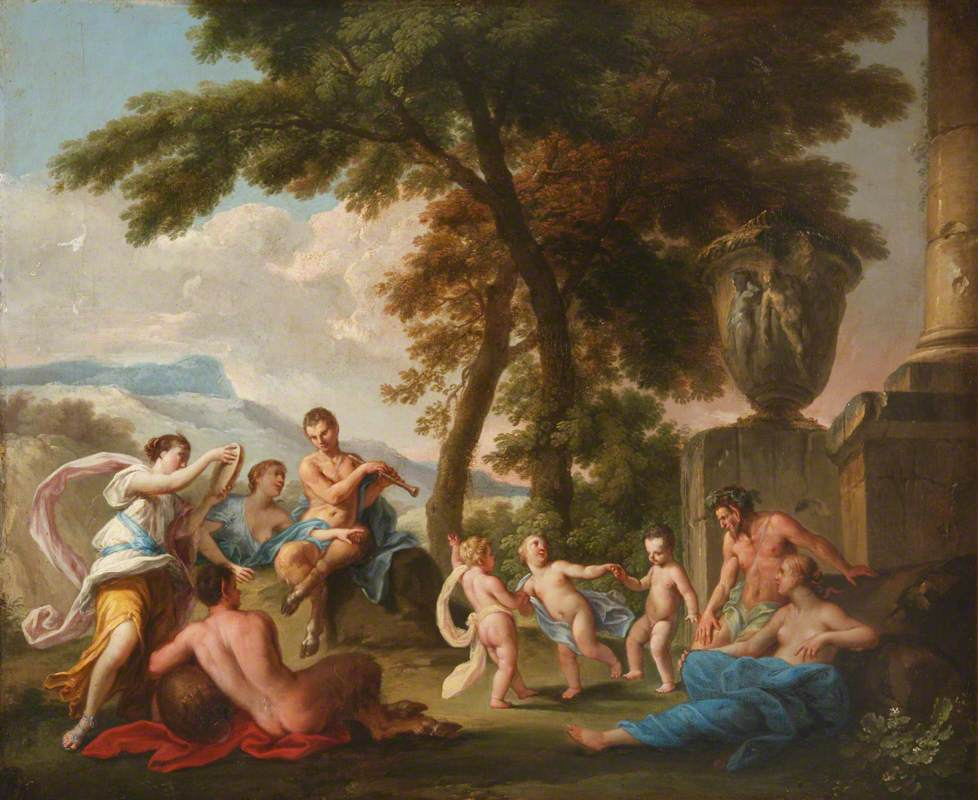
A Bacchanalian Scene, 1715, London, Osterley House

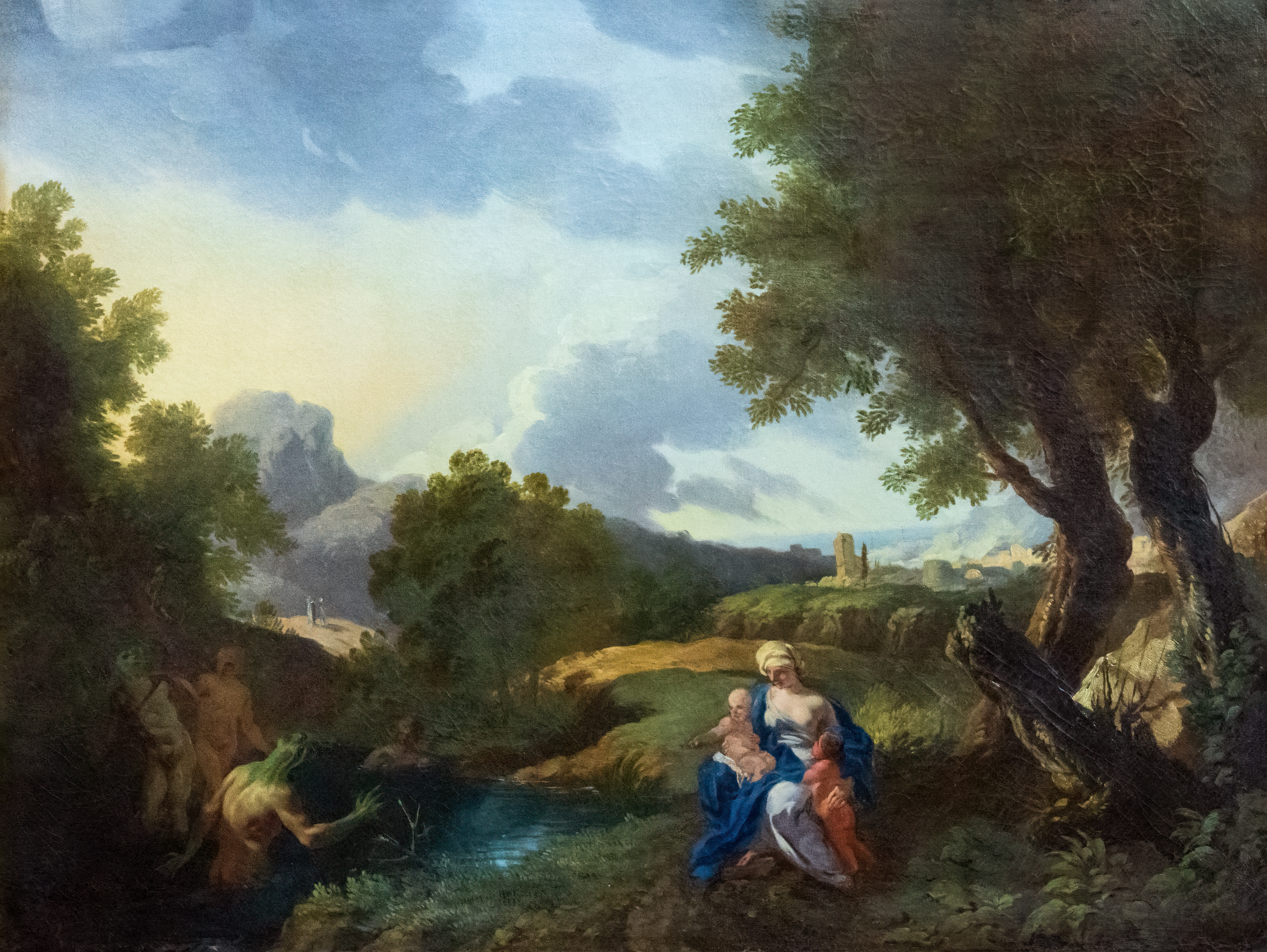
Latona and the Peasants of Lycia, c. 1720, Musée d'Art et d'Histoire de Narbonne

Rural landscape, Musée des Beaux-Arts de Carcassonne

Nymphs and Satyrs Celebrating Flora and Priapus with Flowers, 1715, London, National Trust

== Sources ==
- Bryan, Michael; George Stanley (1849). "Lucatelli". A Biographical Dictionary of Painters and Engravers. London: H. G. Bohn. pp. 423–424. OCLC 8648216.
- Farquhar, Maria (1855). "Lucatelli". In Ralph Nicholson Wornum (ed.). Biographical catalogue of the principal Italian painters. London: John Murray. pp. 90–91. OCLC 220878795.
- Vici, Andrea Busiri (1976). Andrea Locatelli and Roman Landscape Painting of the Eighteenth Century. Rome: Ugo Bozzi. OCLC 2777849.
- Michel, Olivier (2003). "Locatelli, Andrea". Grove Art Online. Oxford University Press. doi:10.1093/gao/9781884446054.article.T051505.
