= Braschi family =

XII century italian noble family

- Country: Italy Former countries: Papal States
- Current head: Filippo Braschi
- Titles: Pope (non-hereditary); Prince of the Holy Roman Empire; Prince of Rocca Sinibalda; Duke of Nemi; Duke of Nemi Grandee of Spain 1st Class; Marquess and Count Braschi-Onesti; Marquis of Belmonte Sabino; Count of Falcino

The House of Braschi is an Italian noble family established in Cesena in the 12th century. The family achieved great notoriety with the election of one of its members, Giannangelo Braschi as Pope of the Catholic Church (Pius VI).

== History ==
The Braschi family arrived on the Italian Peninsula in the 12th century, according to tradition, from Sweden, where the surname was originally Brasck or Brascke. At first they were in Alessandria, then in Vicenza, Rimini and finally in Cesena. During time, they acquired numerous noble titles.

== Notable members ==
- Pius VI
- Luigi Braschi Onesti, Duke of Nemi
- Romoaldo Braschi-Onesti, Cardinal

== Art collection ==
- Esquilache Immaculate Conception by Bartolomé Esteban Murillo (now at Hermitage Museum)
- The Mystical marriage of Saint Catherine by Domenico Beccafumi (now at Hermitage Museum)
- Equestrian portrait of Francisco de Moncada by Anthony van Dyck (now at Louvre)
- Virgin and Child by Bernardino Fasolo (now at Louvre)
- Madonna and Child with the Young Saint John by Giulio Romano (now at Louvre)
- Christ Driving the Merchants from the Temple by Bartolomeo Manfredi (now at Musée des Beaux-Arts de Libourne)
- Self-Portrait by Andrea del Sarto (now at Alnwick Castle)

== Notable buildings ==
- Palazzo Braschi in Rome
- Palazzo Braschi in Cesena
- Palazzo Braschi in Terracina
- Rocca Sinibalda Castle
- Villa Torlonia in San Mauro Pascoli
