= Paolo Monaldi =

Italian painter (1710–1779)

- Peasant family, c. 1779, Private collection
- Born: 1704; Rome, Papal States
- Died: 28 July 1780 (aged 75–76); Rome, Papal States
- Education: Paolo Anesi
- Known for: Landscape art
- Style: Baroque

Paolo Monaldi (1704 – 28 July 1780) was an Italian painter of the late-Baroque or Rococo style, known for painting Bambocciata, lively genre scenes of rustic and rural everyday life.

== Biography ==
Paolo Monaldi was born in Rome in 1704. According to Luigi Lanzi he trained with Andrea Locatelli, a specialist of landscape painting (vedute) active in Rome in the mid-18th century. Between 1765 and 1767, he worked under Paolo Anesi in the fresco decoration of the Villa Chigi, built by Cardinal Flavio Chigi along the Via Salaria in Rome. Monaldi contributed notably to pieces illustrating the myths of Diana and Endymion and Angelica and Medoro, set within a series of pastoral landscapes featuring lively popular genre scenes (bambocciate). Monaldi's rural scenes recall the work of Andrea Locatelli. Monaldi worked as a painter for the Rospigliosi family, creating several canvases and genre paintings (bambocciate) for them, including famous portraits of Prince Camillo Rospigliosi's racehorses (such as the horse Aquilino) and scenes like the Feast of Prince Rospigliosi at the Villa della Magliana. During the 1770s he participated in the decoration of Palazzo Barberini in Rome with a series of bambocciate. Monaldi died in Rome on 28 July 1780.

== Sources ==
- Gay, Sophie Anne (2003). "Monaldi, Paolo". Grove Art Online. Oxford University Press. doi:10.1093/gao/9781884446054.article.T058998.
