= Luigi Acquisti =

Italian sculptor

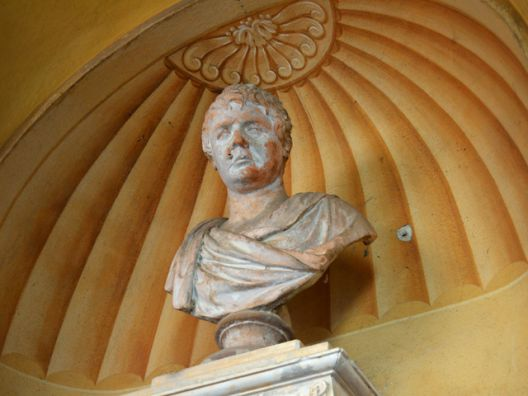
- Born: 29 March 1747; Forlì, Emilia Romagna
- Died: 4 December 1823 (aged 76) in Bologna, Emilia Romagna
- Years active: 1774-1823

Luigi Acquisti (1745–1823) was an Italian sculptor mainly known for his works in the neoclassical style.

He was born in Forlì the 29 March 1747 and died in Bologna in 1823. His works are distributed throughout Italy. Among them are reliefs of Arco della Pace in Milan; the statue of the Vecchia Legge for the facade of Milan Cathedral; Mars and Venus for the Villa Carlotta in Tremezzo on Lake Como; statues in Palazzo Braschi in Rome; and an Atlanta (c. 1806) for the Villa Belgiojoso Bonaparte in Milan.

== Biography ==
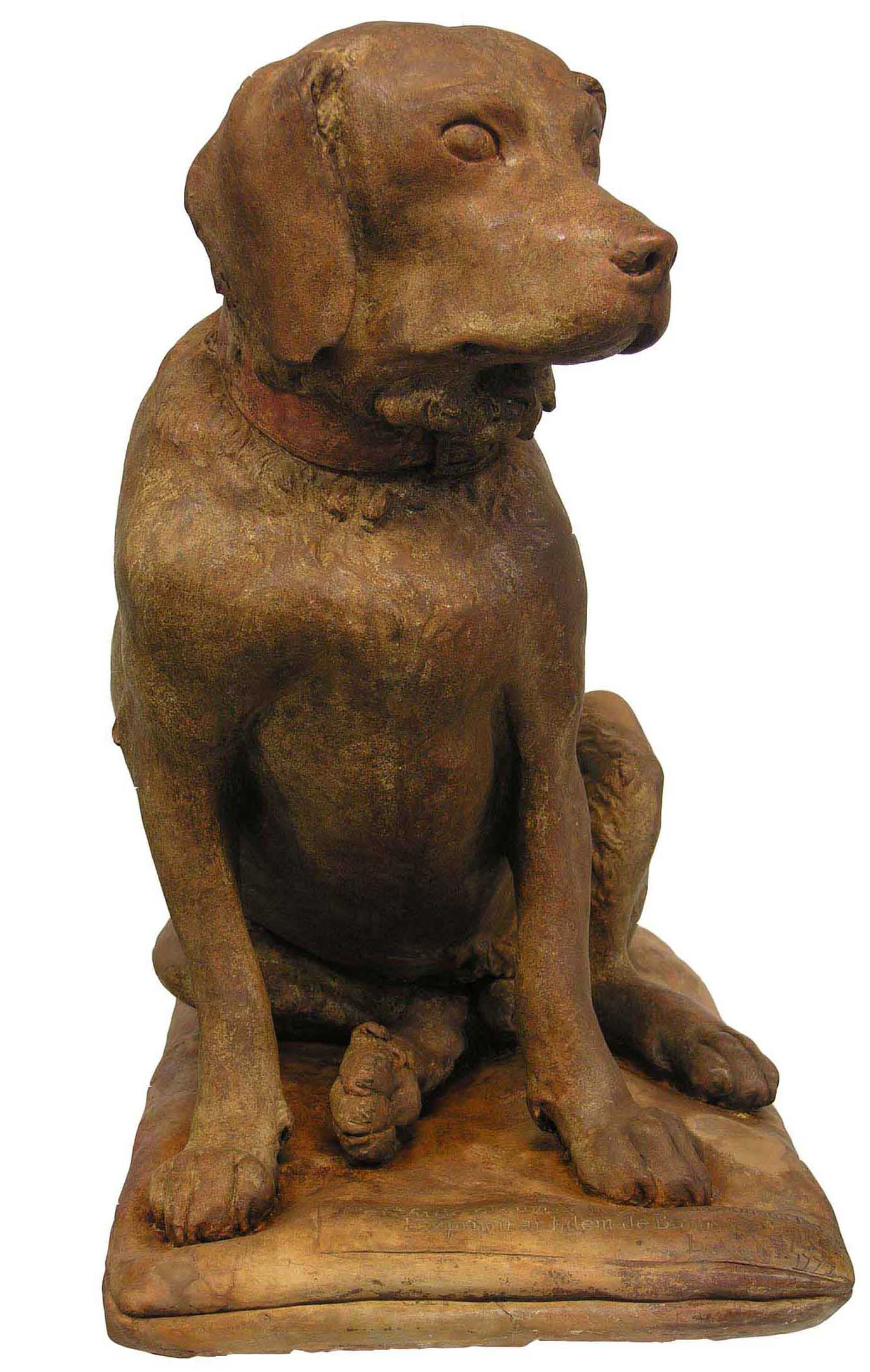
Cane Tago, 1777

Acquisti was still young when he moved to Bologna in order to study at the Accademia Clementina as a student of Filippo Balugani and Carlo Bianconi. He consecutively won the prestigious 1st class Marsili-Aldrovandi prize with his works Enea condotto dalla Sibilla ai Campi Elisi (1774) and Un Romano che rapisce una Sabina (1775). In 1785 he was nominated Academico del Numero in the figurative sculpture class, and in 1780 he became the Direttore di Figura.

He was an honorary member of the Gran Ducale Fiorentina academy (1782), the Academy of St Luke (1803), and the Academy of Mantova.

=== Bologna ===
His work in Bologna (1774–1791) was typified by the decorazioni all'antica or decorations in imitation of the Greco-Roman classics. His work is also imbued with a search of the magnificent and impressive as seen in his enormous statue for the Chiesa del Triregno (1781). His masterpiece from this period is found in the cupola of the Santuario Santa Maria della Vita (1787).

=== Rome ===
In 1792 Acquisti left Bologna for Rome (1792–1807) which was influenced by Acquisti having been a member of the board for the Curlandese prize. In the 1789 edition he saw the neoclassic style typical of Antonio Canova, in the marble relief Le arti incoronate dal Genio by Giacomo De Maria. While in Rome he worked alongside Canova and Valadier. During this period he decorated the Palazzo Braschi near Piazza Navona, and sculpted a large bas-relief for the main altar of the church of San Pantaleo, Rome. 1793/1794 he made a white marble bust of Duke Frederick August of Oldenburg for the Duke's monument in the vestibule of the St Lambert Church in Oldenburg, Germany.

=== Milan ===
After 1807 Acquisti moved to Milan, where he produced among his most famous works such as the marble statue Atalanta, the marble group Mars and Venus, the statue of David on the façade of the Milan Cathedral and reliefs on the Arco della Pace. These last works were completed in neoclassical style.

=== Return to Bologna ===
Acquisti returned to Bologna in 1814, from then until his death producing sculptures for the Certosa of Bologna. However, in the only two works that are known to be his in the cemetery (another pair is attributed to him with the consensus of experts), the artistic level has diminished and the monuments are of a modest nature with sparse detail.

== Legacy ==
Acquisti, along with Giacomo Rossi, helped promote the transition from the graceful figures of the baroque and the flowery rococo to the heroic scenes inspired by Benedetto Alfieri. Despite having travelled around Italy, he is considered a Bolognese artist due to having spent most of his childhood in Bologna, having been educated in Bologna, and producing many of his most important works in Bologna.

He is buried in the Certosa of Bologna.
