= Cane Tago =

1777 statue by Luigi Acquisti

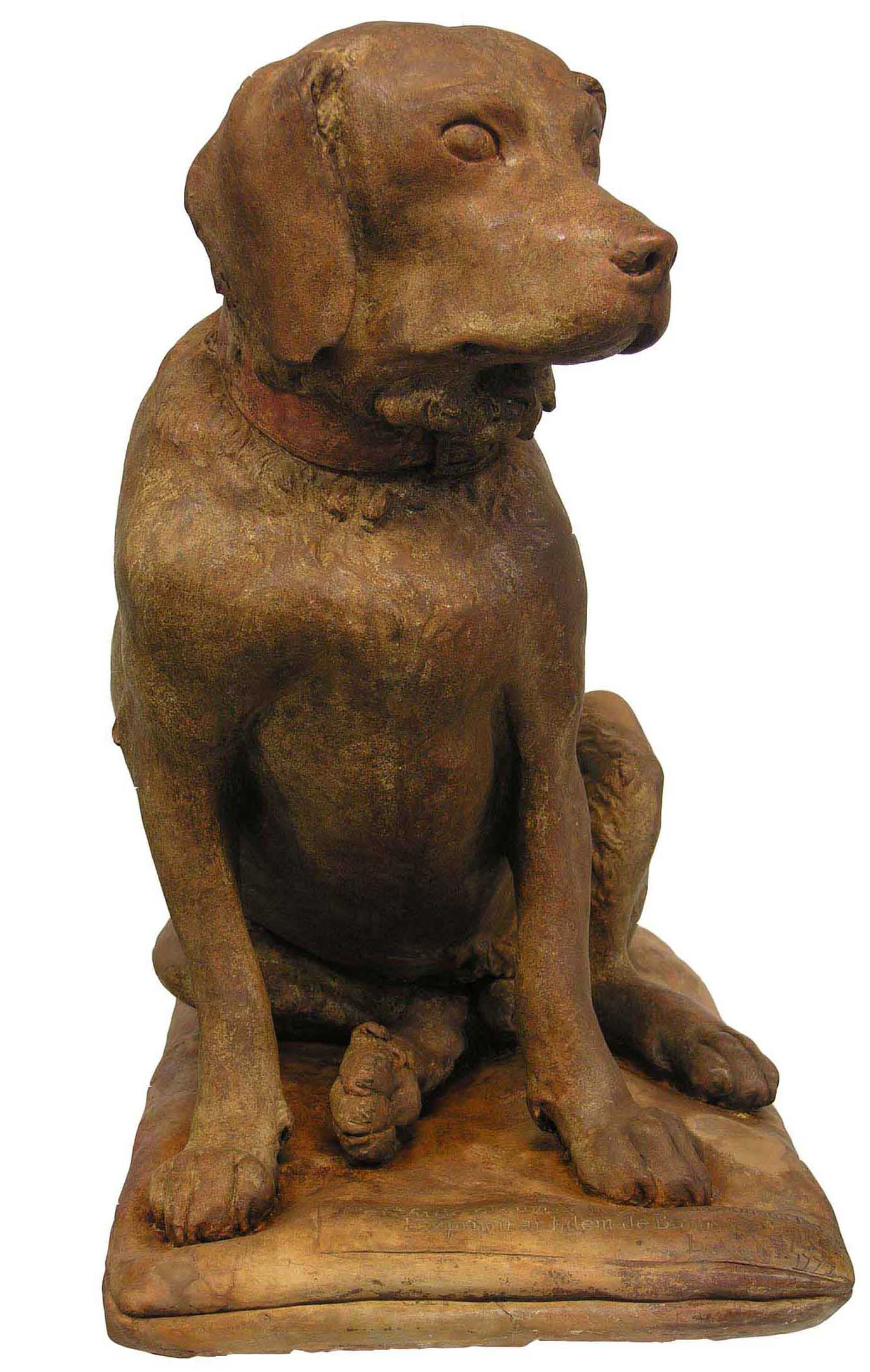
Dog Tago statue

Cane Tago ("The Dog Tago") is a statue erected in Bologna, Italy, in 1777. It was the work of Luigi Acquisti, commissioned by the marquis Tommaso dè Buoi, to celebrate the fidelity of his German Weimaraner hound. The dog had fallen from the windowsill in joy at seeing its master returning from a long journey.

The terracotta statue was placed on the spot where the dog was supposed to have fallen, at the de’ Buoi’House, now the seat of the Cultural Department of the Municipality of Bologna in via Oberdan 24. After 200 years, atmospheric damage necessitated restoration, and the statue was subsequently displayed at the local Museum of Archeology. It is now at the Collezioni Comunali d’Arte, inside Palazzo d'Accursio.
