= San Pantaleo =

San Pantaleo (Italian for "Saint Pantaleon) may refer to:

- San Pantaleo (church), a church in Rome, Italy
- San Pantaleo Island, an island off western Sicily, Italy
- San Pantaleone, Chamois, the parish church of Chamois, Aosta Valley, Italy
- Cathedral of Saint Pantaleon, Dolianova, Sardinia, Italy

== See also ==
- San Pantalon, a church in Venice, Italy
