= San Pantaleo, Rome =

San Pantaleo
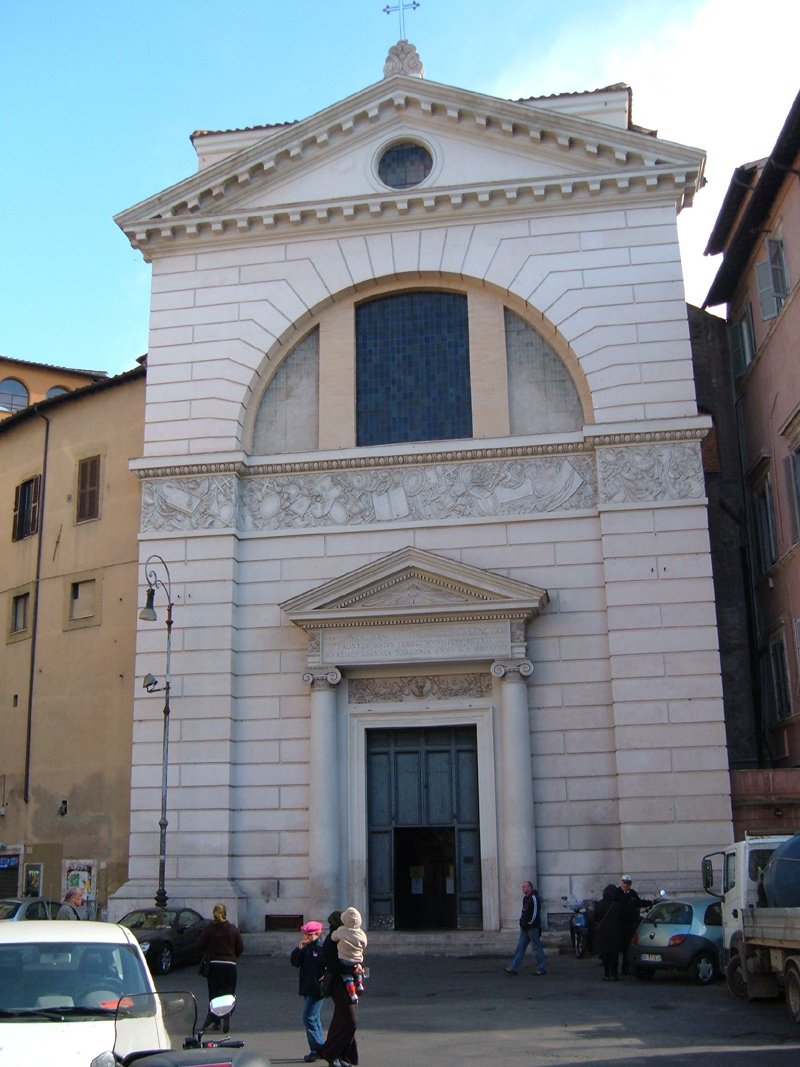
- Facade
- Click on the map for a fullscreen view
- 41°53′50″N 12°28′24″E
- Location: Rome
- Country: Italy
- Denomination: Roman Catholic
- Tradition: Roman Rite

Architecture
- Architectural type: Church

San Pantaleo is an ancient church located on a piazza of the same name along Corso Vittorio Emanuele II in the Parione neighborhood of Rome, Italy. It shares the Piazza with the Museo di Roma in Palazzo Braschi. A church at the site dates from the 12th-century, but the present facade (1807) is in a Neoclassical style and the interiors were elaborated in a Baroque style.

== Names ==
Different sources name the church by various titles, including:

- San Pantaleo de Preta Caroli or San Pantaleonis de Pretecarolis
- San Pantaleo a Pasquino
- San Pantaleo de Muti
- San Pantaleonis de Parione or in Navona
- San Pantaleone alle Scuole Pie

If this were not enough source of confusion, there existed a church in the Rione Monti on the Janiculum Hill, which has been referred to as San Pantaleone alli Pantani or San Pantaleone in Sebucca (perhaps intending in Suburra) or San pantaleonis Trium Clibanorum or Trium Fornorum.

== History ==
Records claim the church at the site was founded by the early 12th century, other records note founding by Pope Honorius III in 1216. In 1418, the church was rebuilt by Alessandro Savelli, who had an adjacent palace. Some notes indicate it was linked to a group of English priests. By 1621, it was restored by the fathers of the Scuole Pie (Piarists) of St Giuseppe Calasanzio, who lived in the adjacent convent. His room is preserved. His relics are held in a porphyry urn under the main altar, while the chapel to St Pantaleo is now a side chapel. On the apse wall behind the main altar is a large marble bas relief depicting San Calasanzio presenting children to the Madonna and Child (1802) by Luigi Acquisti and commissioned by prince Giovanni Torlonia. In 1808, also under the patronage of Prince Giovanni Torlonia, a neoclassical facade was commissioned from the architect Giuseppe Valadier.

The significance of the facade frieze not evident; it depicts a cornucopia Christian symbols, scrolls, books, and shields resembling a display of a triumphal procession.

Among the artworks in the interior nave and two chapels are:

- Triumph of the Name of Mary, ceiling fresco by Filippo Gherardi
- Death of St Joseph (1690) attributed to Sebastiano Ricci
- Santi Giusto e Pastore, sacristy paintings by Pomarancio
- Tomb of Laudomia, daughter of Giovanni Brancaleone
- Other sources mention main altarpiece by Mattia Preti and paintings by Andrea Pozzo
