= Paolo Anesi =

Italian painter (1697–1773)

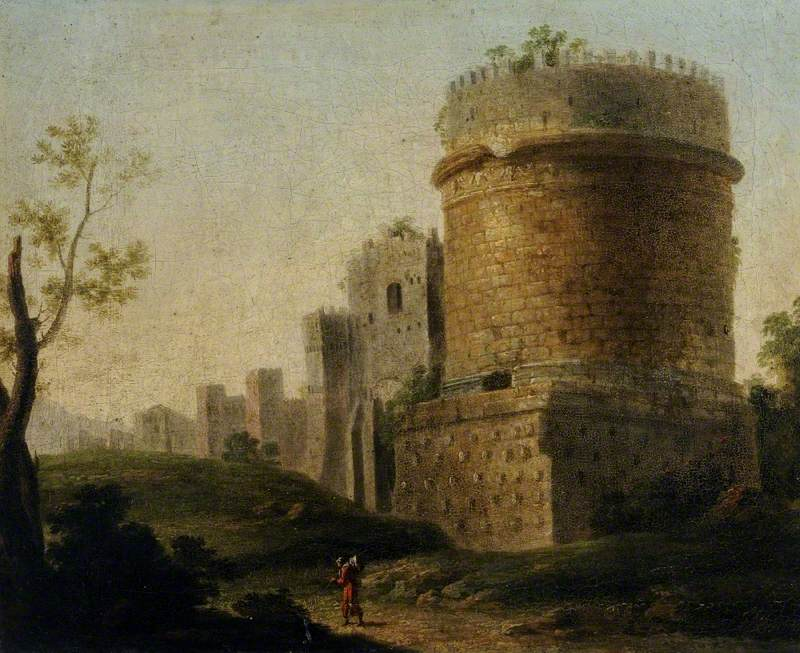
- The Tomb of Caecilia Metella on the Via Appia, Rome, oil on canvas, Burton Constable Hall
- Born: 9 July 1697; Rome, Papal States
- Died: 1773 (aged 75–76); Rome, Papal States
- Education: Giuseppe Bartolomeo Chiari
- Known for: Painting
- Movement: Vedutismo

Paolo Anesi (9 July 1697 – 1773) was an Italian painter of the 18th century, active mainly in painting capriccios and landscapes (vedute) in the style of Giovanni Paolo Pannini.

== Biography ==
Born in Florence, he trained with Giuseppe Bartolomeo Chiari and Bernardino Fergioni. He became famous for his engraved book Varie vedute inventate ed intagliate, published in Rome in 1725. Anesi visited Florence at least twice and made drawings of the local countryside. After his first journey at the beginning of 1729, four of his drawings (Florence, Uffizi), belonging to Niccolò Gabburri, were exhibited at Santissima Annunziata, Florence.

During another visit, in 1737, after Anesi had been there for six months, several admirers of his art, including the Marchese Carlo Rinuccini, submitted eleven of his works to the Accademia di Belle Arti di Firenze, of which he duly became a member. He also had a few lines devoted to him by Gabburri in the Vite degli artisti (Florence, Biblioteca Nazionale Centrale, MS. Palatino E.B. 9.5). These circumstances, and the fact that Francesco Zuccarelli was a pupil of his, gave rise to a belief that Anesi was a Florentine, but his time in Florence was in fact no more than a successful interlude in a career otherwise based in Rome, where, on 8 January 1747, his achievements won him entry to the assembly of Virtuosi al Pantheon.

Anesi’s clientele was prestigious; Charles Emmanuel III, King of Sardinia, bought six landscapes from him in 1731 through the painter Claudio Francesco Beaumont and went on to buy four more the following year. Foreign art lovers—British and French, both visitors to and residents in Italy—sought him out, including Henry Hoare for Stourhead, Wiltshire, and Cardinal François-Joachim de Pierre de Bernis, two of whose acquisitions can still be traced, the Landscape in the Roman Campagna and Ruins of the Temple of Bacchus (both Toulouse, Musée des Augustins).

Anesi’s work was best represented, however, in the collections of the Roman aristocracy, including the Colonna, Pallavicini, Valenti Gonzaga, Pamphili and Rondinini collections (six paintings in the 1809 inventory). His works were also in the collections of well-known contemporary artists, such as Piranesi. Anesi owed part of his reputation to his wall decorations painted in gouache, which continued the tradition of the 17th-century masters. Many of his wall paintings have been destroyed, but he is known to have worked at the Roman priory of the Knights of Malta in 1732 and to have decorated the Villa Doria Pamphili, Janiculum, in 1749, and to have executed four overdoor paintings there; he also collaborated with Marco Benefial, his friend in later life, at the Palazzo Massimo d’Arsoli.

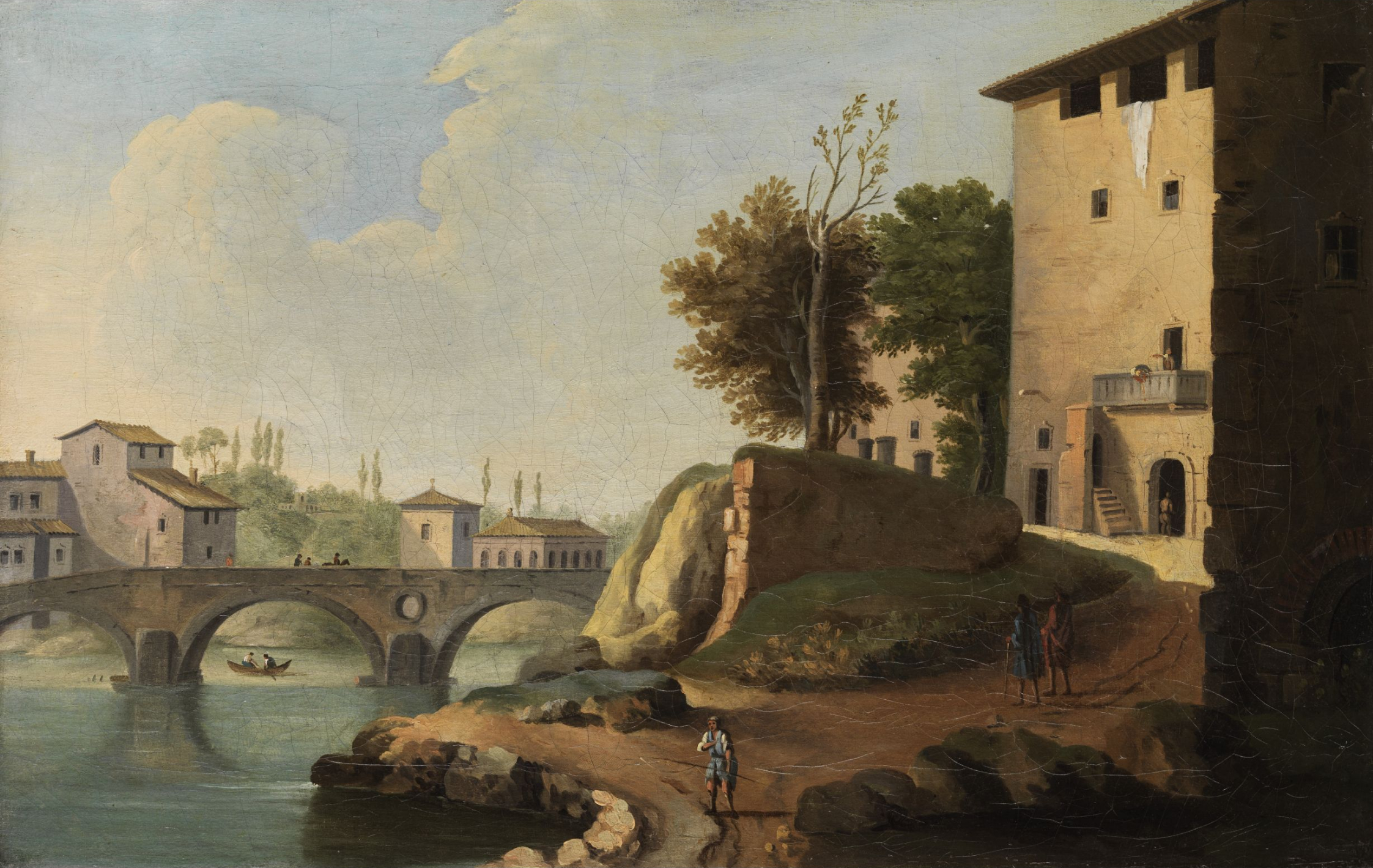
Landscape of Rome with the Ponte Sisto by Paolo Anesi

Towards 1760 Anesi was one of the team that decorated Cardinal Alessandro Albani’s villa in the Via Salaria, but the extent of his contribution is not known. He was certainly responsible for eight panels, celebrating ancient Rome in a happy, arcadian light, in the Zeus room. The frescoes and paintings were removed and sold, and consisted of large canvases depicting Landscape with Vista of Borghetto, Fantasy Landscape of Lazio with dancing figures and river, Vedute of Ariccia and Fantasy Landscape of Roman Ruins and Figures.

He also painted landscape panels (1767; figures by Paolo Monaldi) for the Villa Chigi, 11 of which survive (Milan, Alemagna priv. col.), including the View of Ariccia and the Rustic Scene in Latium with a Country Dance. In 1767–8 Anesi decorated two rooms in the Palazzo Borghese with architectural capricci and vedute exalting Rome’s ideal beauty in monumental and rustic style. The style of these decorations, graceful and a shade melancholic, anticipates the Romantic movement.

== Gallery ==
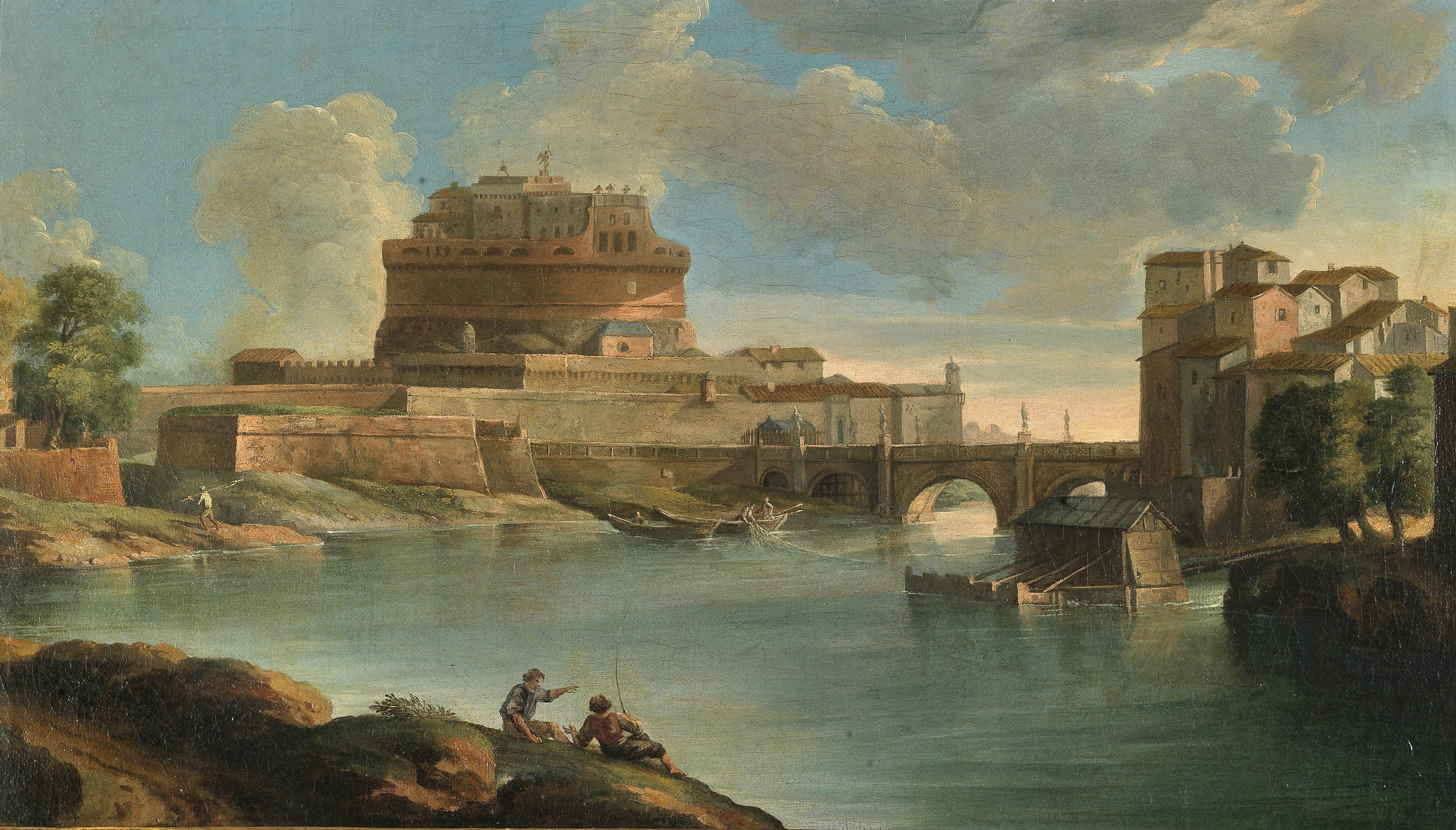
Castel Sant'Angelo

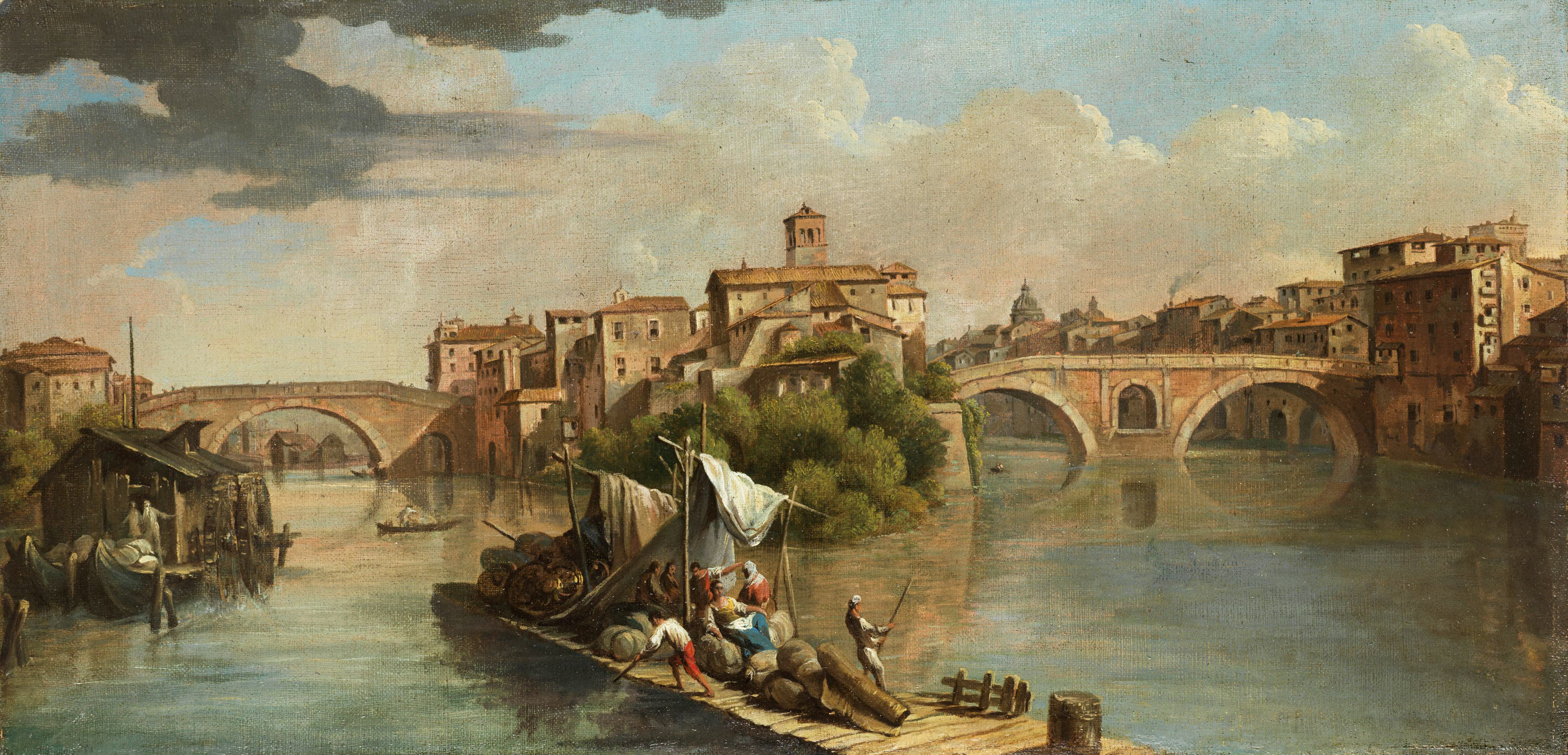
Tiber Island

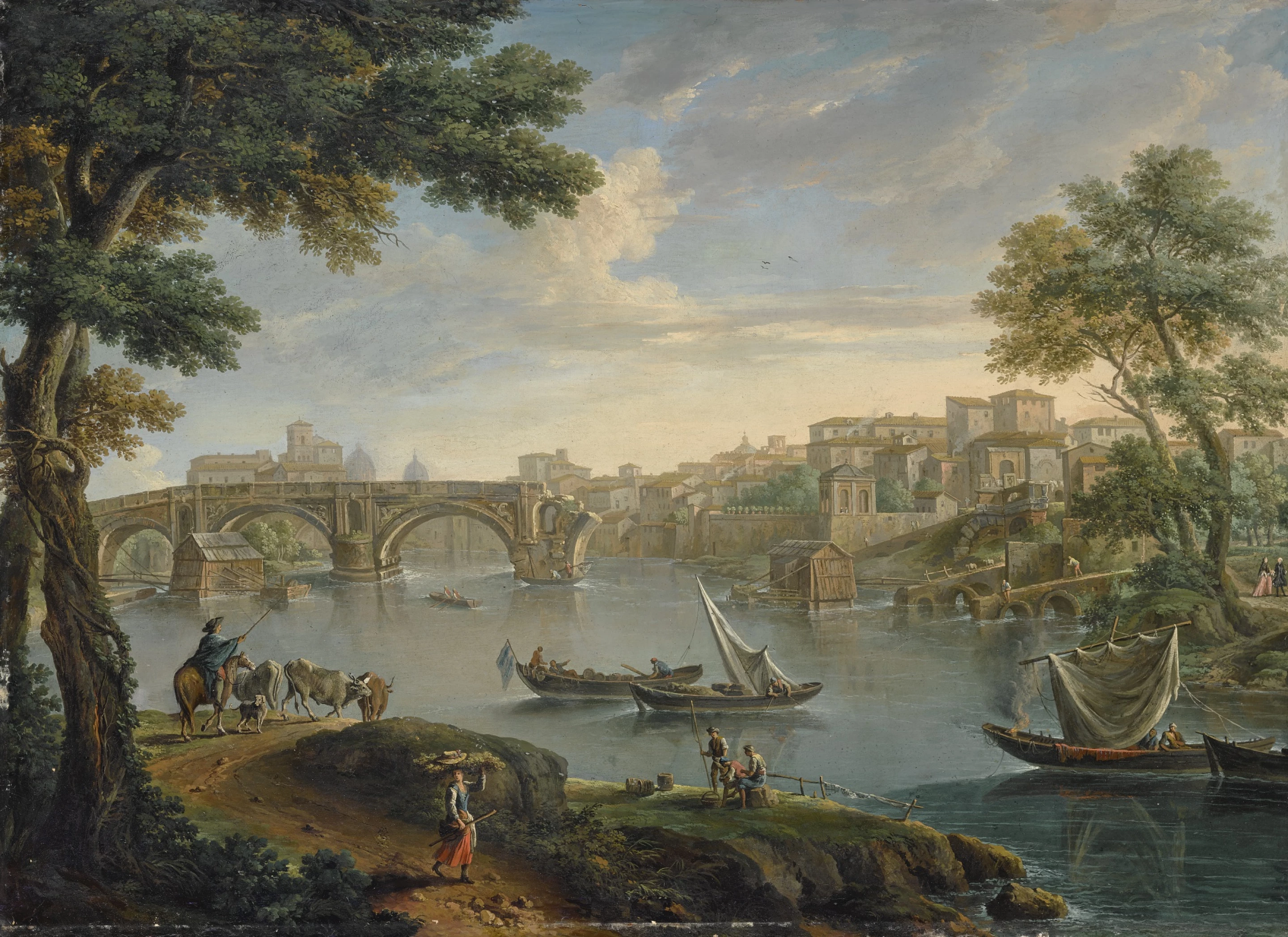
View of the Tiber River with the Ponte Rotto

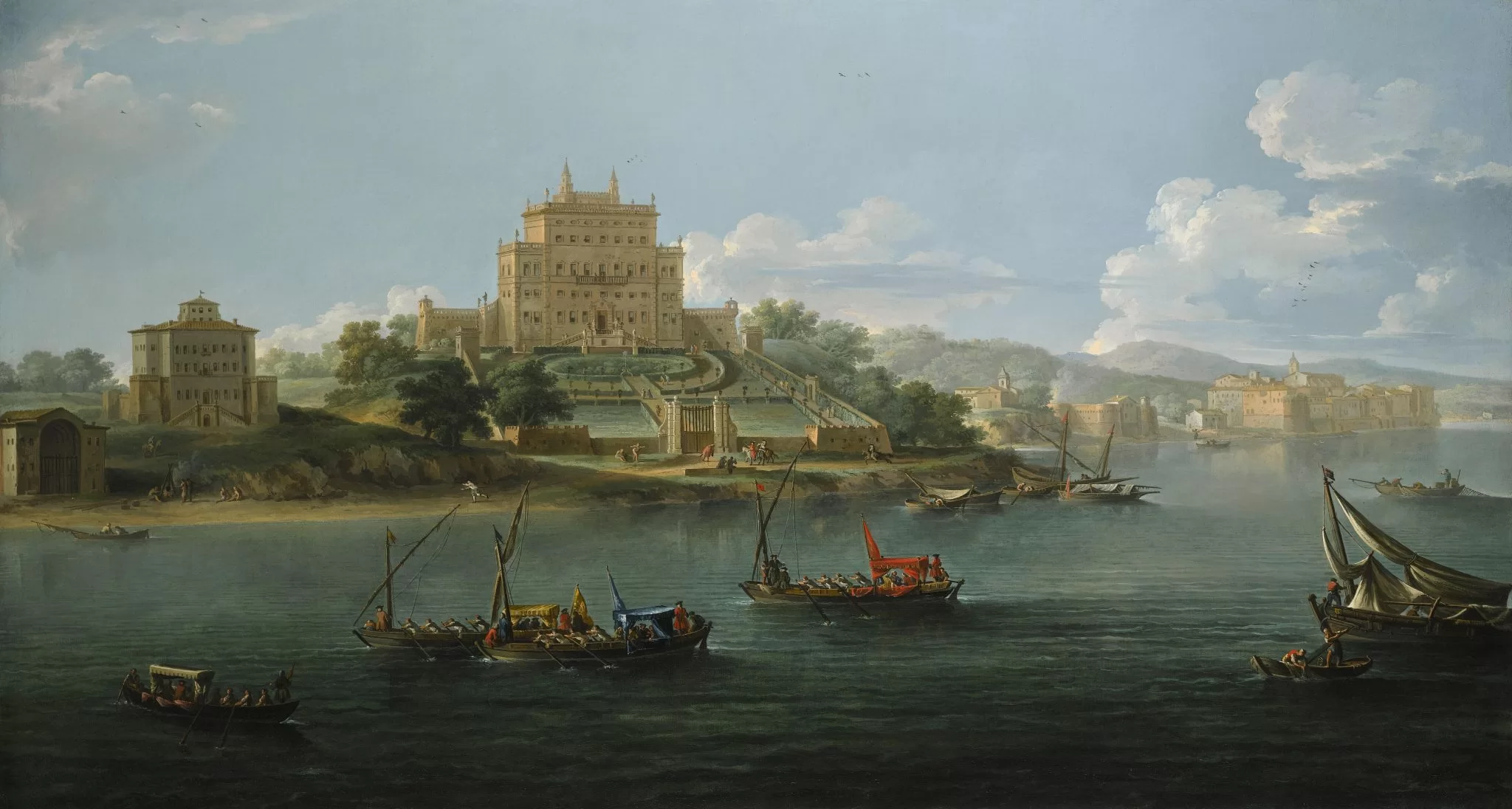
Villa Costaguti and Villa Pamphilj

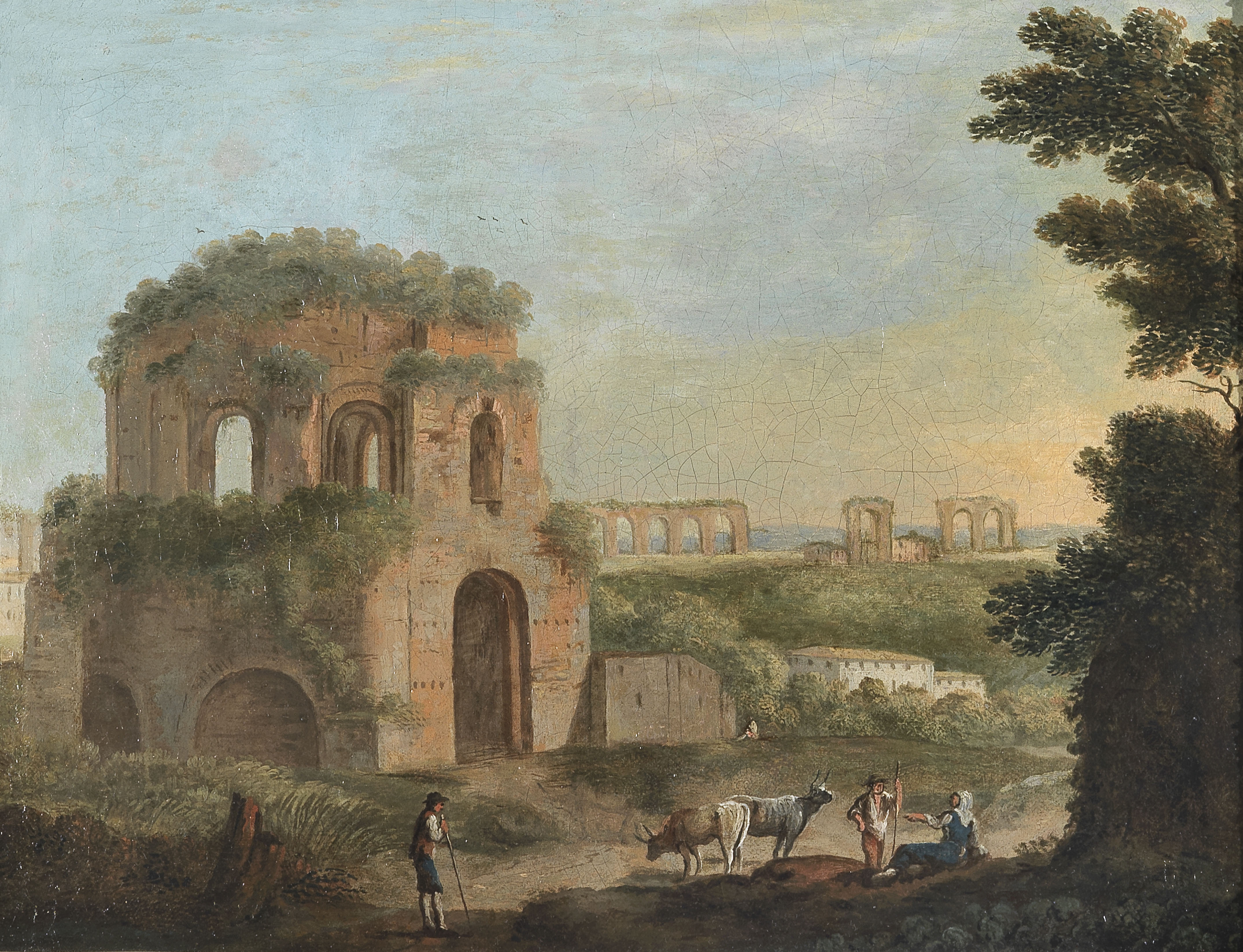
Temple of Minerva Medica

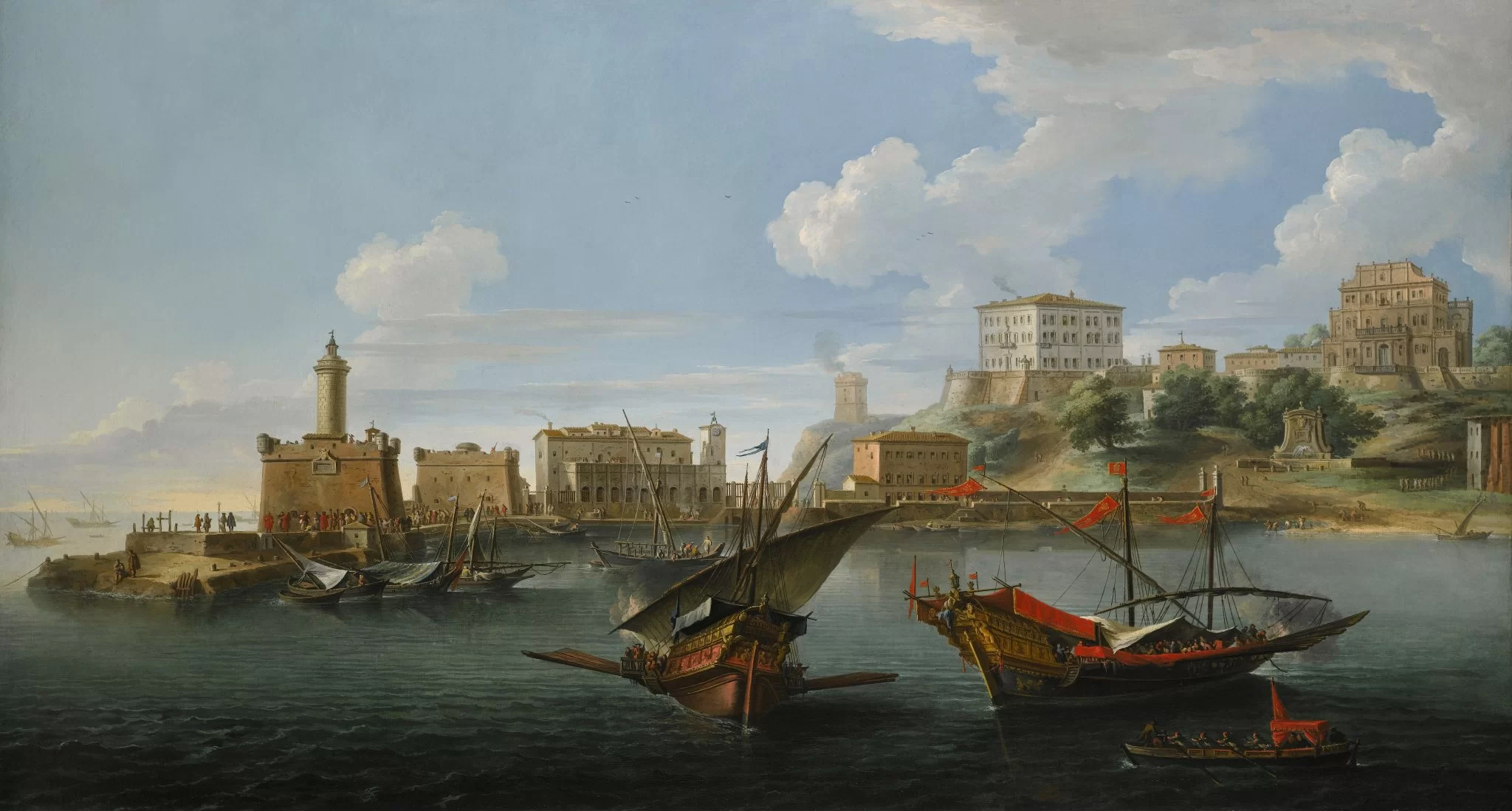
View of Anzio

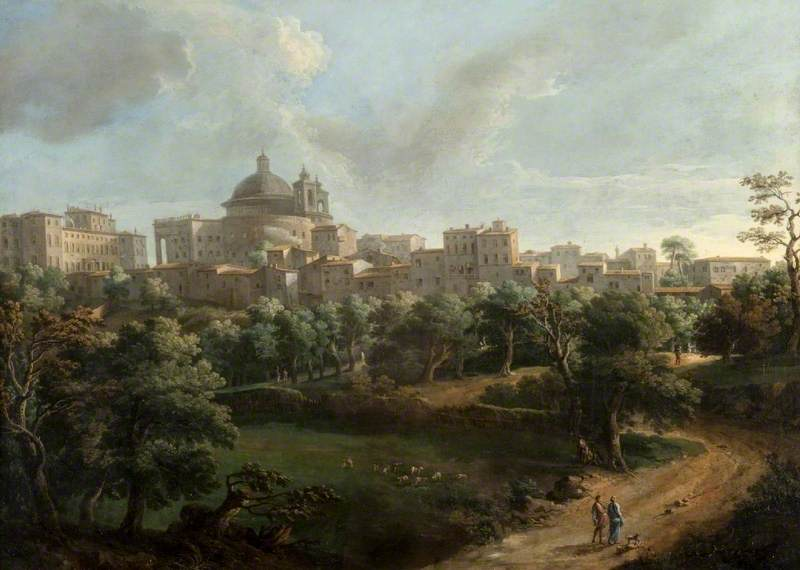
View of Ariccia

== Bibliography ==
- Farquhar, Maria (1855). Ralph Nicholson Wornum (ed.). Biographical catalogue of the principal Italian painters. London: Woodfall & Kinder. p. 7.
