= Giovanni Carlo Bandi =

Italian Catholic cardinal (1709–1784)

His Eminence Giovanni Carlo Bandi
- Bishop of Imola
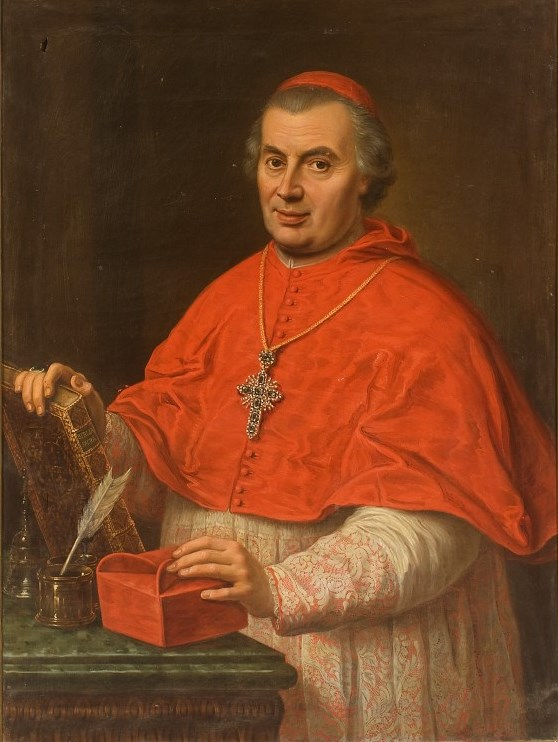
- Church: Roman Catholic Church
- Diocese: Imola
- See: Imola
- Appointed: 20 March 1752
- Term ended: 23 March 1784
- Predecessor: Tommaso Maria Marelli
- Successor: Barnaba Chiaramonti
- Other post: Cardinal-Priest of Santa Maria del Popolo (1775-84)
- Previous posts: Titular Bishop of Botrys (1744-52); Auxiliary Bishop of Ostia–Velletri (1744-52)

Orders
- Ordination: 18 September 1734
- Consecration: 28 December 1744 by Carlo Alberto Guidoboni Cavalchini
- Created cardinal: 29 May 1775 ("in pectore"); 11 September 1775 (revealed) by Pope Pius VI
- Rank: Cardinal-Priest

Personal details
- Born: Giovanni Carlo Bandi; 17 July 1709 Cesena, Papal States
- Died: 23 March 1784 (aged 74) Imola, Papal States
- Parents: Francesco Bandi; Cornelia Zangheri

Styles of Giovanni Carlo Bandi
- Reference style: His Eminence
- Spoken style: Your Eminence
- Informal style: Cardinal
- See: Imola

Giovanni Carlo Bandi JUD (17 July 1709 – 23 March 1784) was an Italian cardinal who served as Bishop of Imola.

== Life ==
Bandi was born in Cesena, the son of the count Francesco Bandi and the countess Cornelia Zangheri. He was the uncle of Pope Pius VI on his mother's side.

He was educated at the University of Fermo where he received a doctorate in utroque iure (both canon and civil law) on 9 December 1734. He was ordained on 18 September 1734. He served as an Auditor of Cardinal Tommaso Ruffo. He served as vicar general of the Suburbicarian See of Ostia.

=== Episcopate ===
He was appointed as titular bishop of Botri and appointed suffragan of Ostia and Velletri on 18 December 1744. He was Consecrated on 28 December 1744 by Carlo Alberto Guidobono Cavalchini. He was transferred as bishop to the Diocese of Imola on 20 March 1752.

=== Cardinalate ===
He was created cardinal in pectore in the consistory of 29 May 1775. His nomination was published in the consistory of 11 September of that year, when he was named Cardinal-Priest of Santa Maria del Popolo (installed 18 December 1774). He served as bishop of Imola until his death at the age of 74 in 1784.

Catholic Church titles
Preceded by	Auxiliary Bishop of Ostia-Velletri; 1744–1752	Succeeded by
Preceded by Ferenc Zichy	Titular Bishop of Botrys; 1744–1752	Succeeded by Johann Georg Franz von Stinglheim
Preceded by Giovanni Tommaso Maria Marelli	Bishop of Imola; 1752–1784	Succeeded by Barnaba Chiaramonti
Preceded by Franz Konrad Kasimir Ignaz von Rodt	Cardinal-Priest of Santa Maria del Popolo; 1775–1784	Succeeded by Giovanni Maria Riminaldi
