= Falconieri =

Falconieri is an Italian surname. Notable people with the surname include:

- Andrea Falconieri (1585/86–1656), Italian composer
- Vito Falconieri (born 1986), Italian footballer
- Member of an old family from Florence, Italy:
  - Alexis Falconieri (1200–1310), priest
  - Juliana Falconieri (1270–1341), religious
  - Lelio Falconieri (1585–1648), nobleman
  - Orazio Falconieri (died 1664), catholic cardinal
  - Paolo Falconieri (1638–1704), architect and virtuoso
