= Palazzo Braschi =

Palace in Rome, Italy

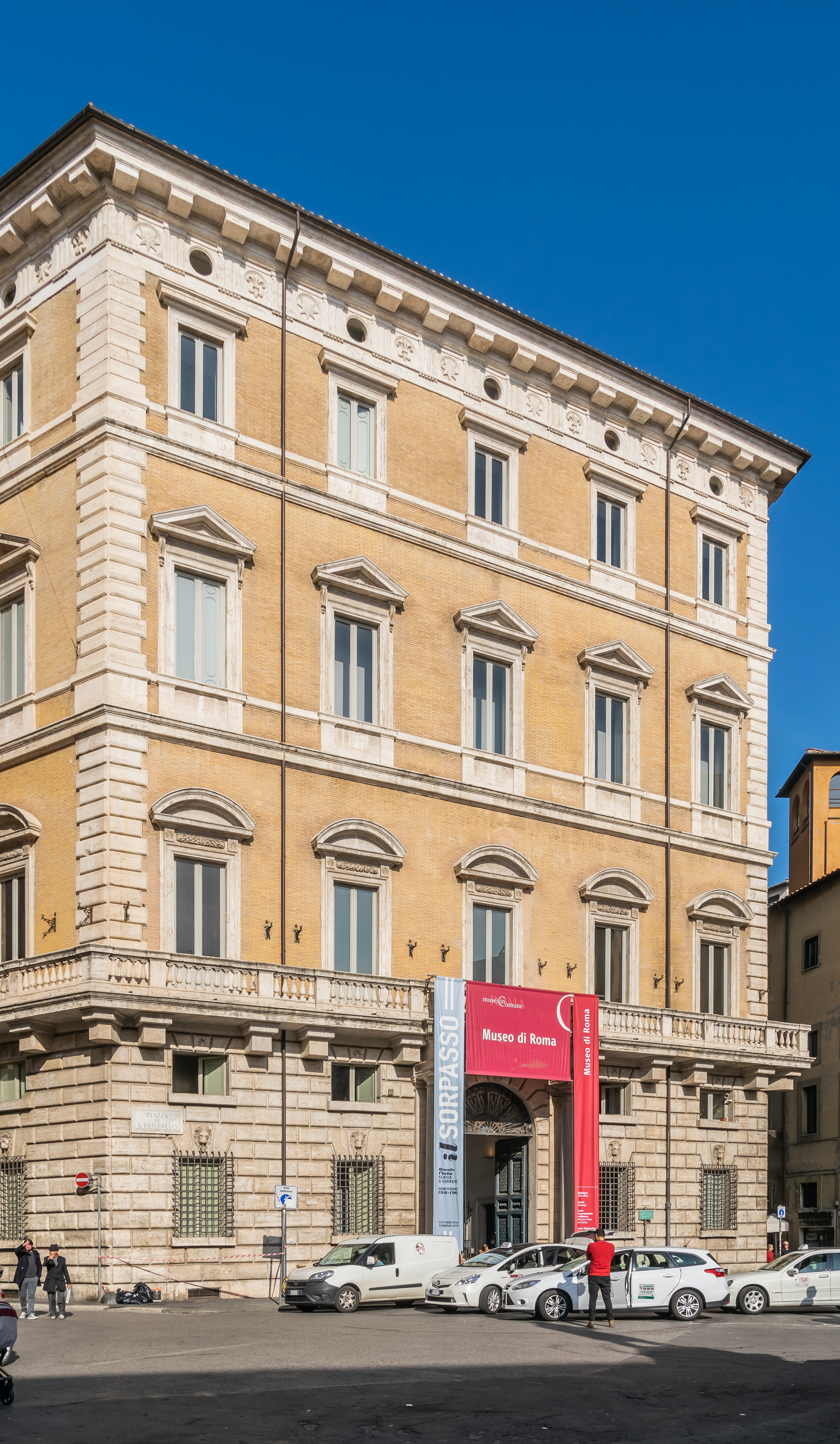
- Façade of the palace on Piazza di S. Pantaleo
- Interactive map of the Palazzo Braschi area

General information
- Type: Palace
- Architectural style: Neoclassical
- Location: Piazza di S. Pantaleo 10, Rome, Italy
- Coordinates: 41.8973°N 12.4729°E
- Current tenants: Museo di Roma
- Construction started: 1790
- Client: Luigi Braschi Onesti

Design and construction
- Architect: Cosimo Morelli

Palazzo Braschi (Italian: [paˈlat.tso ˈbras.ki]) is a large Neoclassical palace in Rome, Italy and is located between the Piazza Navona, the Campo de' Fiori, the Corso Vittorio Emanuele II and the Piazza di Pasquino. It presently houses the Museo di Roma, the "Museum of Rome", covering the history of the city in the period from the Middle Ages through the nineteenth century.

== History ==
The palace was commissioned by the papal nephew, Duke Luigi Braschi Onesti. He was the son of Count Girolamo Onesti and Giulia Braschi, sister of Pope Pius VI, who created him Duke of Nemi. The architect was Cosimo Morelli. The site had been purchased in 1790 by Braschi, supported by funds from Pope Pius VI. Braschi demolished the 16th-century palace that Giuliano da Sangallo the Younger had built for Francesco Orsini in order to erect his own from the ground up. Construction was suspended in February 1798 during the Napoleonic occupation of the city, when the French temporarily took possession of it until 1802 and confiscated the recently acquired collection of antiquities it contained (though Braschi was reimbursed for them). In 1809, when Rome was declared an Imperial city by Napoleon, Duke Luigi moved into the palace and was declared mayor.

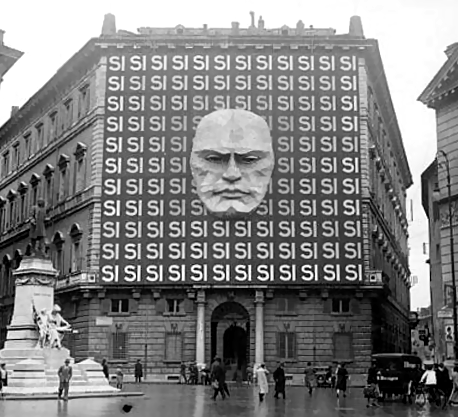
The Mussolini façade, 1934. The "SI" (Italian for "yes") refers to the 1934 Italian general election, which was a simple yes-no vote on the Fascist Party list.

On his death in 1816 the palace remained unfinished and the family funds depleted. In 1871 the Braschi Onesti heirs sold the building to the Italian State, who made it the seat of the Ministry of Interior (now moved into Palazzo del Viminale). During the Italian fascist period, it was used as the political headquarters of Benito Mussolini, and was adorned with a giant sculpture of the dictator's face surrounded by the word "SI" (Italian for "YES”). After the war, it housed 300 refugee families and many of the interior frescoes were seriously damaged by the fires they lit to keep warm. In 1949 the palace passed to the civic authorities and, following extensive conservation in 1952, the present installation of the museum was effected.

The main entrance is on Via San Pantaleo (between Piazza Navona and Corso Vittorio Emanuele). In the piazza, is the Monument to Marco Minghetti; Minghetti had led the Ministry of the Interior and served as prime minister, with offices in this palace. The oval hall inside the main entrance overlooks Via San Pantaleo, and leads to the monumental staircase with its eighteen red granite columns which came from the gallery built by the Emperor Caligula on the banks of the River Tiber. Decorating the staircase there are ancient sculptures and fine stuccoes by Luigi Acquisti inspired by the myth of Achilles. On the piazza at the Southwest corner of the palace is the statue of Pasquino.

The Neoclassical architect Giuseppe Valadier designed the chapel on the piano nobile or first floor. He also designed the white marble façade on the adjacent church of San Pantaleo for which is named the piazza in front of the Palazzo Braschi.
