= Cornelia Zangari Bandi =

Italian noblewoman known for mysterious death (1664–1731)

- Born: 20 July 1664; Longiano, Papal States
- Died: 15 March 1731 (aged 66); Cesena, Papal States
- Known for: Her mysterious death, allegedly spontaneous human combustion
- Title: Countess
- Spouse: Francesco Bandi
- Children: Giovanni Carlo, Maria Colomba, Margherita Felice, Giuseppe, Anna Teresa, Elisabetta, Anna Margherita
- Father: Francesco Maria Zangari
- Relatives: Pope Pius VI (grandson)

Cornelia Zangari Bandi (20 July 1664 – 15 March 1731) was an Italian noblewoman, generally known for the circumstances surrounding her mysterious death, which is the original inspiring case and namesake of the purported phenomenon of spontaneous human combustion.

== Biography ==
=== Family ===
Cornelia Zangari was born in Longiano (Emilia-Romagna), Papal States, to Count Francesco Maria Zangari and his wife Margherita. She married Count Francesco Bandi and gave birth to Giovanni Carlo (future Cardinal of the Catholic Church), Maria Colomba, Margherita Felice, Giuseppe, Anna Teresa, Elisabetta and Anna Margherita. Her daughter Anna Teresa married Count Marco Aurelio Braschi, giving birth in 1717 to Giovanni Angelo, future Pope Pius VI (1775 – 1799).

=== Death ===
According to the 1745 issue by the correspondent Paul Rolli (who translated, for the Philosophical Transactions of the Royal Society, a 1731 study by the Veronese historian Giuseppe Bianchini: Parere Sopra la Cagione della Morte della Signora Contessa Cornelia Zangari Ne' Bandi Cesenate (Opinion on cause of death of Lady Countess Cornelia Zangari), during her last dinner, the 66 year-old countess was "dull and heavy". Some accounts report that she was a brandy drinker, and that she used to sprinkle camphorated brandy on her body to relieve physical pain. The maid accompanied her to her room, and the two spent over three hours chatting and praying. The maid left her mistress already asleep. The next day, when she did not get up at the usual time, she went to wake her and found the remains of the countess. The room was full of soot. The body of the countess had been reduced to a pile of ashes that was a little more than 1 metre (3 ft 3 in) from the bed, although her lower legs below the knee, three fingers and front of her skull were relatively intact. The bed and the rest of the furniture had not been affected by the fire, but were covered by a greasy and smelly layer. On the floor there was an oil lamp covered with ashes, but without oil. The way the sheets were found seemed to indicate that the countess had risen at some point during the night. The full account by Paul Rolli:

The Countess Cornelia Bandi, in the 62d [sic] Year of her Age, was all Day as well as she used to be; but at Night was observed, when at Supper, dull and heavy. She retired, was put to Bed, where she passed three Hours and more in familiar Discourses with her Maid, and in some Prayers; at last, falling asleep, the Door was shut. In the Morning, the Maid, taking notice that her Mistress did not awake at the usual Hour, went into the Bed-chamber, and called her; but not being answer'd, doubting of some ill Accident, open'd the Window, and saw the Corpse of her Mistress in this deplorable Condition.

Four Feet Distance from the Bed there was a Heap of Ashes, two Legs untouched, from the Foot to the Knee, with their Stockings on; between them was the Lady's head; whose Brains, Half of the Backpart of the Scull, and the whole Chin, were burnt to Ashes; amongst which were found three Fingers blacken'd. All the rest was Ashes, which had this particular Quality, that they left in the Hand, when taken up, a greasy and stinking Moisture. The air in the Room also observed cumbered with Soot floating in it: A small Oil-Lamp on the Floor was cover'd with Ashes, but no oil in it. Two Candles in Candlesticks upon a table stood Upright; the-Cotton was left in both, but the Tallow was gone and vanished. Somewhat of Moisture was about the Feet of the Candlesticks. The Bed receiv'd no Damage; the Blankets and Sheets were only raised on one Side, as when a Person rises up from it, or goes in: The whole Furniture, as well as the Bed, was spread over with moist and ash colour Soot, which had penetrated into the Chest-of-drawers, even to foul the Linnens: Nay the Soot was also gone into a neighbouring Kitchen, and hung on the Walls, Movables, aid Utensils of it. From the Pantry a Piece of Bread cover'd with that Soot, and brown black, was given to several Dogs, all which refuse to eat it. In the Room above it was moreover taken notice, that from the lower Part of the Windows trickled down a greasy, loathsome, yellowish Liquor and thereabout they smelled like a Stink, without knowing of what; and saw the Soot fly around.

It was remarkable, that the Floor of the Chamber was so thick smear'd with a gluish Moisture, that it could not be taken off; and the Stink spread more and more through the other Chambers.

— An Extract, by Mr. Paul Rolli, F.R.S. of an Italian Treatise, written by the Reverend Joseph Bianchini, a Prebend in the City of Verona; upon the Death of the Countess Cornelia Zangari & Bandi, of Cesena. To which are subjoined Accounts of the Death of Jo. Hitchell, who was burned to Death by Lightning; and of Grace Pitt at Ipswich, whose Body was consumed to a Coal.

This paper was the origin of the concept of spontaneous human combustion.

== In popular culture ==
Charles Dickens, in his preface to his novel Bleak House (1852/1853), writes about the Countess (whom he misnames Countess Cornelia de Baudi Cesenate) with regard to the "possibility of what is called spontaneous combustion."

== See also ==
- List of unsolved deaths

== Gallery ==
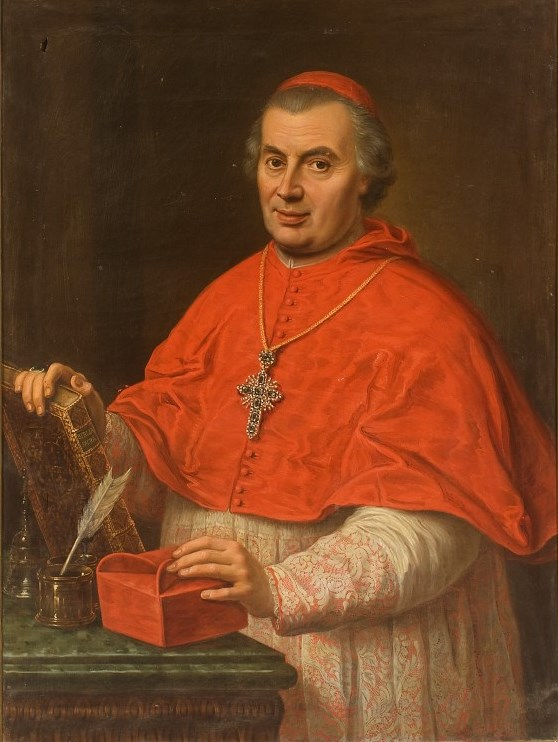
Giovanni Carlo, artist unknown

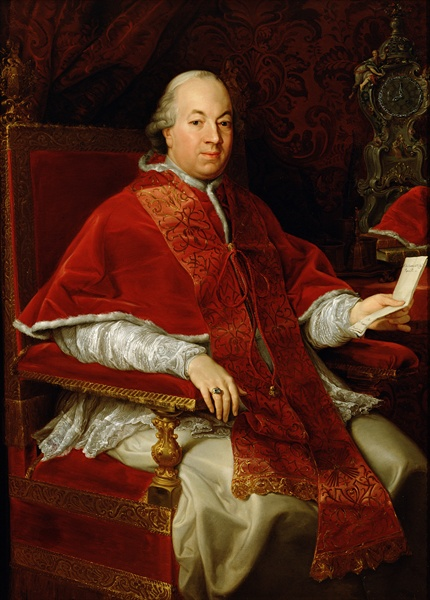
Pope Pius VI, by Pompeo Batoni (1775)
