= Parricide =

Intentional killing of one's parent(s)

Parricide is the deliberate killing of one's own parent. It is an umbrella term that can be used to refer to acts of matricide, the deliberate killing of one's own mother, and patricide, the deliberate killing of one's own father.

Societies consider parricide a serious crime and parricide offenders are subject to criminal prosecution under the homicide laws which are established in places (i.e., countries, states etc.) in which parricides occur. In most countries, an adult who is convicted of parricide faces a long-term prison sentence, a permanent prison sentence, or even a death sentence. Youthful parricide offenders who are younger than the age of majority (e.g., 18-year-olds in the United States & United Kingdom of Great Britain) may be prosecuted under less stringent laws which are designed to take their special needs and development into account, but these laws are usually waived and as a result, most youthful parricide offenders are transferred into the Adult Judicial System.

Parricide offenders are typically divided into two categories;

1. youthful parricide offenders (i.e. ages 8–24) and
2. adult parricide offenders (i.e. ages 25 and older)

because the motivations and situations surrounding parricide events change as a child matures.

Parricide scholar Kathleen M. Heide has proposed four offender types;

1. "severely abused adolescent" offenders who act to end their abuse or in protection of siblings,
2. "severely mentally ill" offenders who act in a delusional state,
3. "dangerously antisocial" perpetrators who act to eliminate a perceived obstacle in their freedom or for financial gain i.e. life insurance or inheritance and
4. "enraged" offenders who act in an impulsive moment of anger.

== Prevalence ==
As per the Parricide Prevention Institute, approximately 2–3% of all U.S. murders were parricides each year since 2010. The more than 300 parricides occurring in the U.S. each year means there are 6 or more parricide events, on average, each week. This estimate does not include the murders of grandparents or stepparents by a child – only the murders of their natal or legally adoptive parents.

== Youthful motives ==
Youthful parricide is motivated by a variety of factors. Current research conducted by the Parricide Prevention Institute indicates the top five motives causing a young person (aged 8–24 years old) to commit parricide are:

- issues of control – 38% (e.g. put on restriction, phone taken away, etc.);
- issues of money – 10% (access to life insurance, wants money for a party, etc.);
- stop abuse of self or family – 8%;
- fit of anger – 8%;
- wants a different life – 7% (e.g. wants to live with non-custodial parent, etc.).

== Notable modern-day cases ==
- The Criminal Code of Japan once determined that patricide brought capital punishment or life imprisonment. However, the law was abolished because of the trial of the Tochigi patricide case in which a woman killed her father in 1968 after she was sexually abused by him and bore their children.
- Charles Whitman killed his mother and his wife before climbing the bell tower at UT-Austin and randomly killing people in 1966. Upon autopsy he was found to have a tumor on his amygdala.
- Lyle and Erik Menendez both killed their parents in 1989, alleging that they feared their parents were plotting to kill them after years of abuse.
- Dana Ewell hired two of his friends to murder his father, mother and sister in 1992. All three were convicted of murder.
- Kip Kinkel killed his parents before committing the Thurston High School shooting in 1998.
- Suzane von Richthofen killed her father and her mother with the help of her boyfriend and his brother in São Paulo in 2002.
- Nicole Kasinskas killed her mother with the help of her boyfriend in 2003.
- Sarah Marie Johnson was the only female to kill both of her parents without the help of an accomplice in 2003.
- Thomas Bartlett Whitaker killed his mother and his brother (and tried to kill his father but failed) in 2003.
- Tyler Hadley killed both of his parents on July 16, 2011.
- Adam Lanza killed his mother before committing the Sandy Hook Elementary School shooting in 2012.
- Dellen Millard killed his father in 2012 and inherited millions. He and his friend Mark Smich worked together as serial killers both before and after the murder; murdering Laura Babcock and Tim Bosma.
- Henry Chau Hoi-leung killed and dismembered his parents in 2013.
- Robert and Michael Bever killed their parents and 3 siblings in 2015.
- Joel Michael Guy Jr. killed and dismembered both of his parents on the Saturday after Thanksgiving in 2016.
- A 21-year-old Turkish man in Bayraklı, İzmir who was studying chemistry killed his parents by making them drink the cyanide sharbat he had prepared in May 2019.
- Chandler Halderson killed and dismembered both of his parents on July 1, 2021.
- A 19-year-old Japanese man in Tosu, Saga Prefecture, killed his parents by stabbing them with a knife in the neck on March 9, 2023.
- David Kozák murdered his father before carrying out the 2023 Prague shootings.
- Jennifer Pan orchestrated kill-for-hire plot targeting her parents in 2010.
- Nick Reiner allegedly killed both of his parents in 2025. The case is notable due to the fame of his father, Rob Reiner.
- Christopher Porco killed his father and attempted to kill his mother with an axe in their beds in 2004.
- Grant Amato stole over $200,000 from his family to send to a Bulgarian cam model. After he was confronted, he killed his parents and brother.

== Notable historical cases ==
- Tullia the Younger, along with her husband, arranged the murder and overthrow of Servius Tullius, her father, securing the throne for her husband.
- Lucius Hostius reportedly was the first parricide in Republican Rome, sometime after the Second Punic War.
- John Parricida (c. 1290–1312) killed his uncle Albert I of Germany and as the result ended the first attempt of the Habsburg to become hereditary kings.
- Mary Blandy (1720–1752) poisoned her father, Francis Blandy, with arsenic in England in 1751.
- Lizzie Borden (1860–1927) was an American woman accused and acquitted of murdering her father and stepmother.

== Legal definition in Roman times ==
In the sixth-century AD collection of earlier juristical sayings, the Digest, a precise enumeration of the victims' possible relations to the parricide is given by the 3rd century AD lawyer Modestinus:

By the lex Pompeia on parricides it is laid down that if anyone kills his father, his mother, his grandfather, his grandmother, his brother, his sister, first cousin on his father's side, first cousin on his mother's side, paternal or maternal uncle, paternal (or maternal) aunt, first cousin (male or female) by mother's sister, wife, husband, father-in-law, son-in-law, mother-in-law, (daughter-in-law), stepfather, stepson, stepdaughter, patron, or patroness, or with malicious intent brings this about, shall be liable to the same penalty as that of the lex Cornelia on murderers. And a mother who kills her son or daughter suffers the penalty of the same statute, as does a grandfather who kills a grandson; and in addition, a person who buys poison to give to his father, even though he is unable to administer it.

== Gallery ==
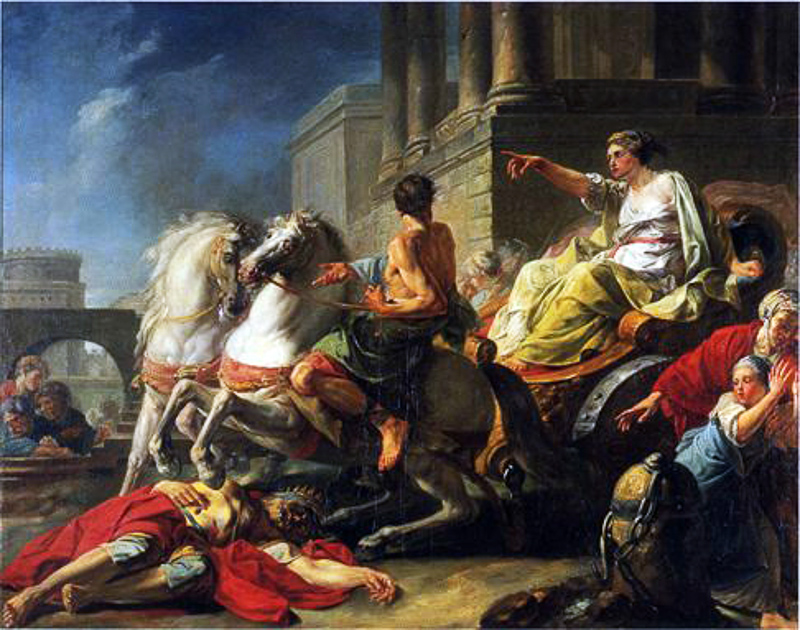
Tullia Drives over the Corpse of her Father

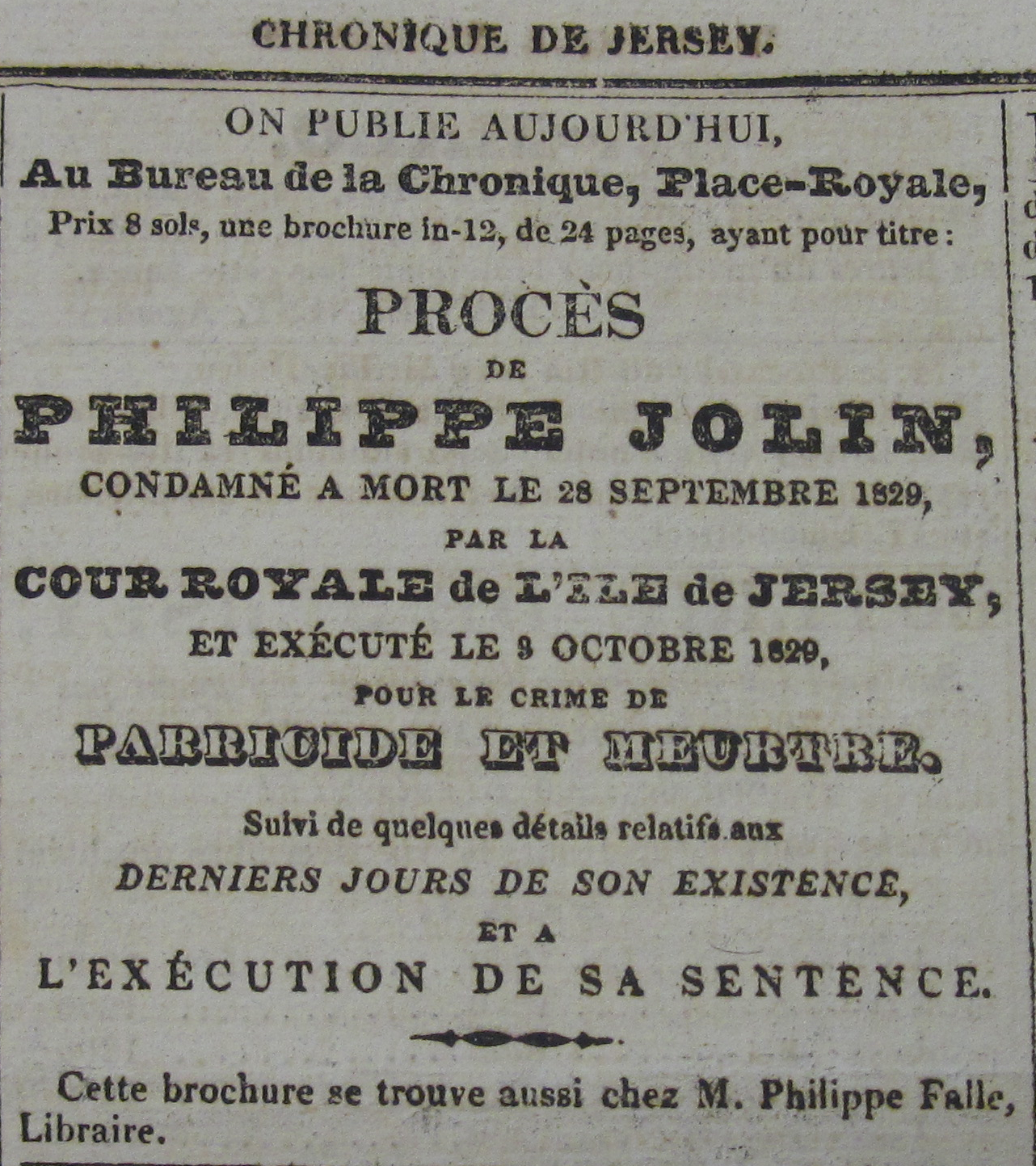
Parricide, capital punishment in Jersey

== See also ==
- Avunculicide, the killing of one's uncle
- Filicide, the killing of one's child
- Fratricide, the killing of one's brother
- Mariticide, the killing of one's husband
- Nepoticide, the killing of one's nephew
- Patricide, the killing of one's father
- Matricide, the killing of one's mother
- Prolicide, the killing of one's offspring
- Sororicide, the killing of one's sister
- Uxoricide, the killing of one's wife
