= Landesmuseum Mainz =

Art and history museum in Germany

Coordinates: 50°00′14″N 8°16′04″E

Mainz State Museum
- Landesmuseum Mainz
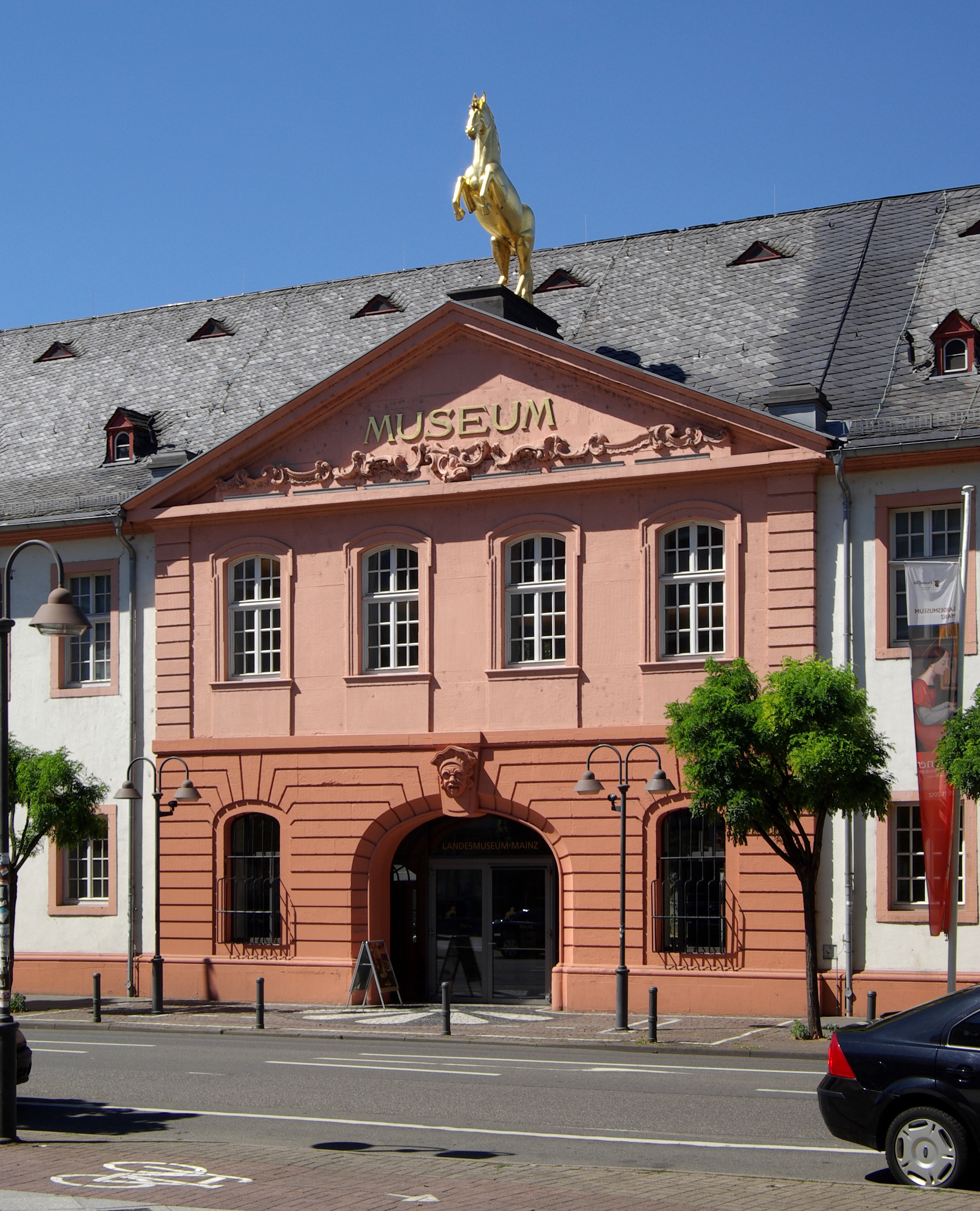
- Main entrance to the museum building
- Former names: Bonne ville de l’Empire (1803-1814); Städtische Gemäldegalerie; Altertumsmuseum (until 1967); Mittelrheinisches Landesmuseum (1967-1986)
- Location: Mainz, Rhineland-Palatinate, Germany
- Founder: Jean-Antoine Chaptal
- Director: Birgit Heide
- Owner: GDKE
- Public transit access: Mainz Hauptbahnhof
- Website: landesmuseum-mainz.de/en/

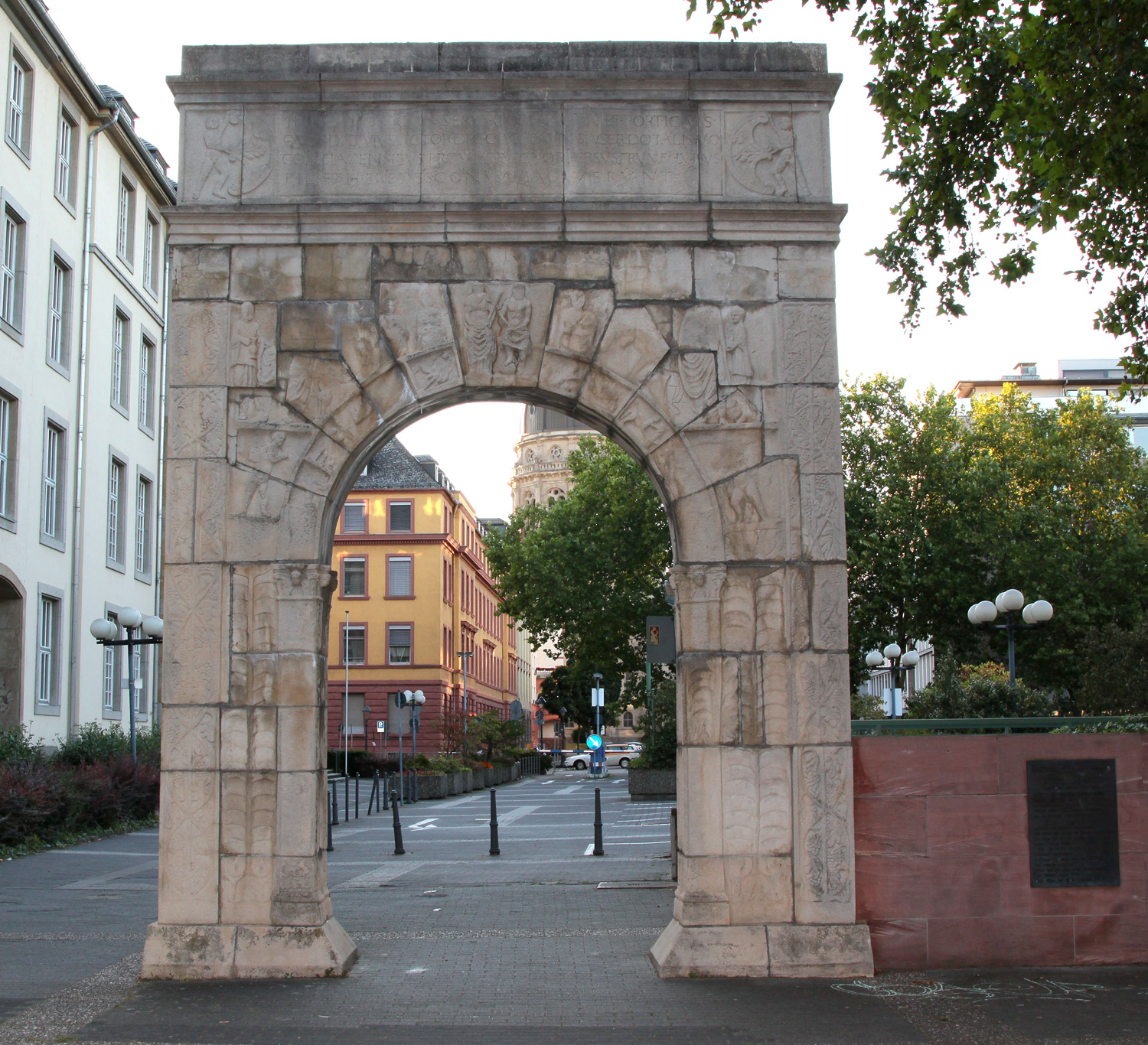
A facsimile of the museum's Dativius Victor Arch (3rd century) on Ernst-Ludwig-Platz, Mainz.

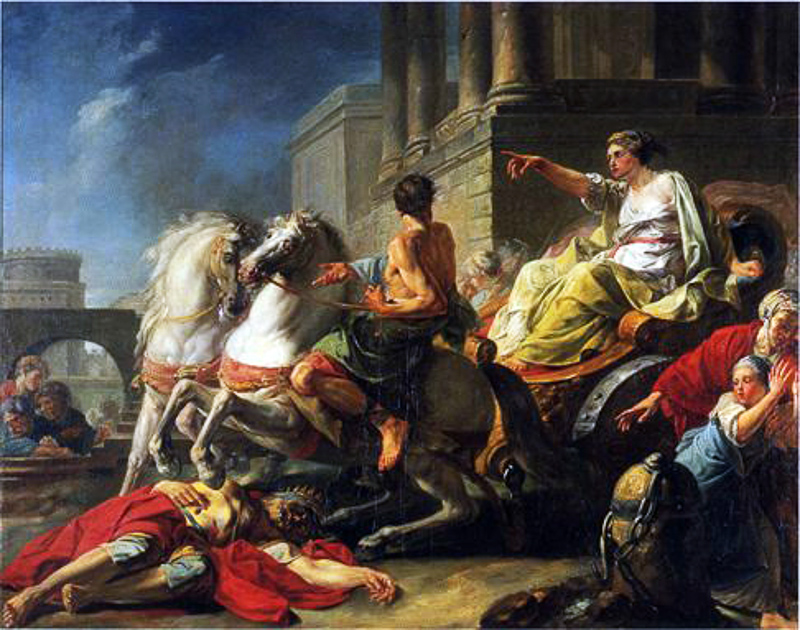
Jean Bardin: Tullia Drives over the Corpse of her Father (1765).

The Landesmuseum Mainz, rendered in English as the Mainz State Museum, is a museum of art and history in Mainz, Germany. In March 2010 it reopened in full after an extensive renovation.

The museum has its roots in a painting collection donated by Napoleon and Chaptal to what was then the city of Mayence, Mont-Tonnerre in 1803. It moved into its current location, in the former electoral stables, in 1937, by which time it had grown significantly. It received its present name in 1986, and was renovated and modernised from 2004 to 2010.

== Collections ==
(Partial list.)

Pre-Historic and Roman Departments

Antiquities from the Mainz area, including a Venus-like statue from 23,000 BC; stone axes from the Late Stone Age; Roman stone memorials; busts of bronze and marble; a 1st-century Roman Jupiter Column; a 3rd-century Roman arch.

Prince Johann Georg Collection

Near-Eastern finds assembled by Prince Johann Georg, including medieval icons, Byzantine art and Egyptian relics.

Medieval Department

A Byzantine spangenhelm; a Madonna made of ivory; a relief cycle of Prince Electors; a cycle of nine paintings of Mary by the Master of the Housebook.

Renaissance Department

Works by Lorenzo di Credi, Hans Baldung Grien (presumed), Peter Binoit (presumed), Philippe de Champaigne, Willem Claeszoon Heda, and Jean Bardin.

Baroque Collection

17th- and 18th-century paintings, sculptures, furniture and porcelain from Germany, France, the Netherlands and Italy; a set of equipment belonging to Maximilian von Welsch.

19th- and 20th-century Paintings

Works by Philipp Veit, Wilhelm Lindenschmit the Elder, Max Liebermann, Lovis Corinth, Antoni Tàpies, and one painting by Pablo Picasso (Head of a Woman). The large collection of Max Slevogt paintings is mostly displayed in Villa Ludwigshöhe.

Graphics Collection

Works by Edgar Degas, Paul Signac, Alfred Sisley, Picasso, William Turner (Mainz from the South, watercolour), Adolph von Menzel, and Paul Klee.

Judaica

Items from Mainz's Jewish history, including the gravestone of Gershom ben Judah (d. 1049); cultural and religious items from the 18th and 19th centuries; gold- and silverware.

The museums also hosts teaching events.
