= Tullia Running Her Chariot over the Body of Her Father =

1735 painting by Michel-François Dandré-Bardon

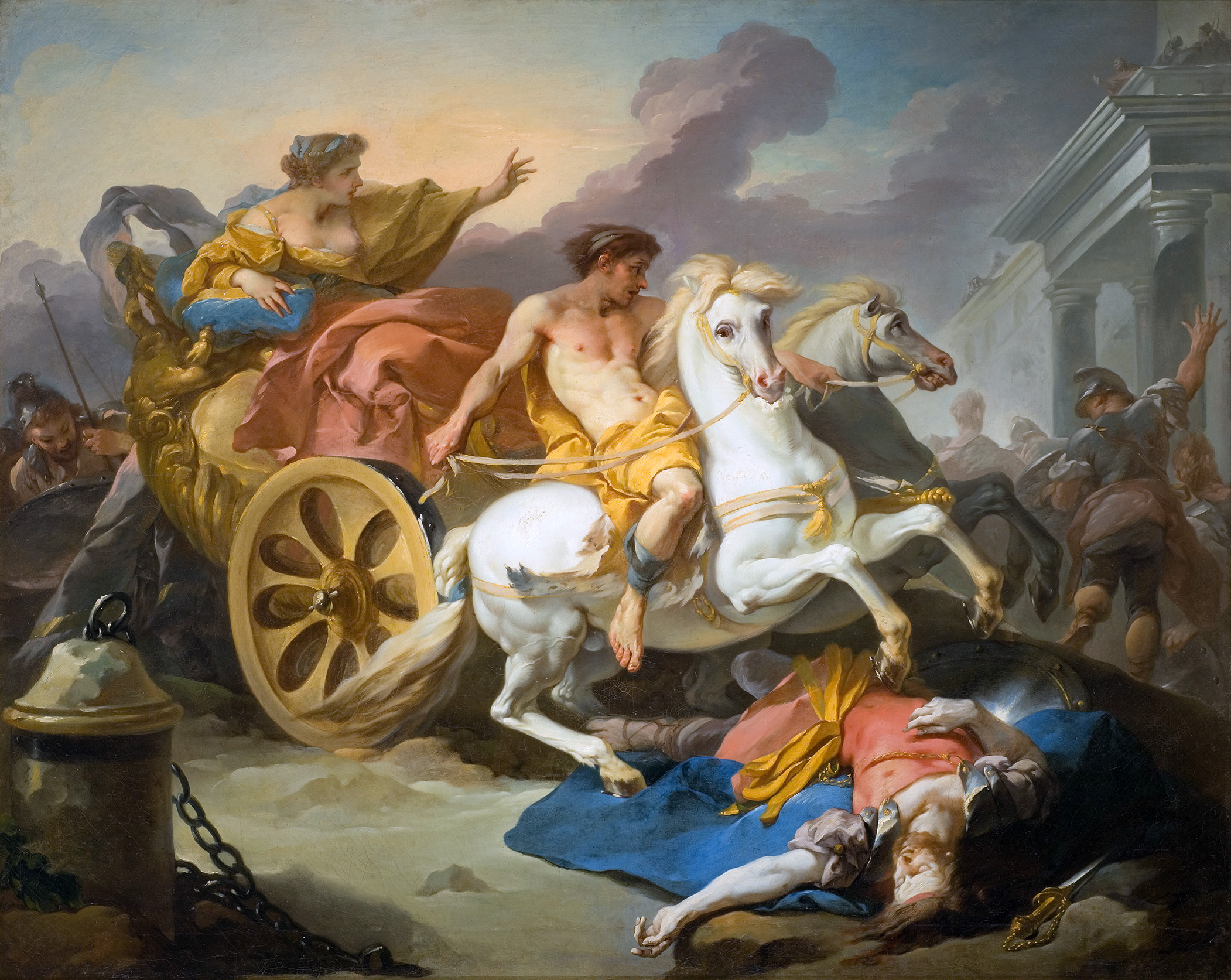
- Artist: Michel-François Dandré-Bardon
- Year: 1735

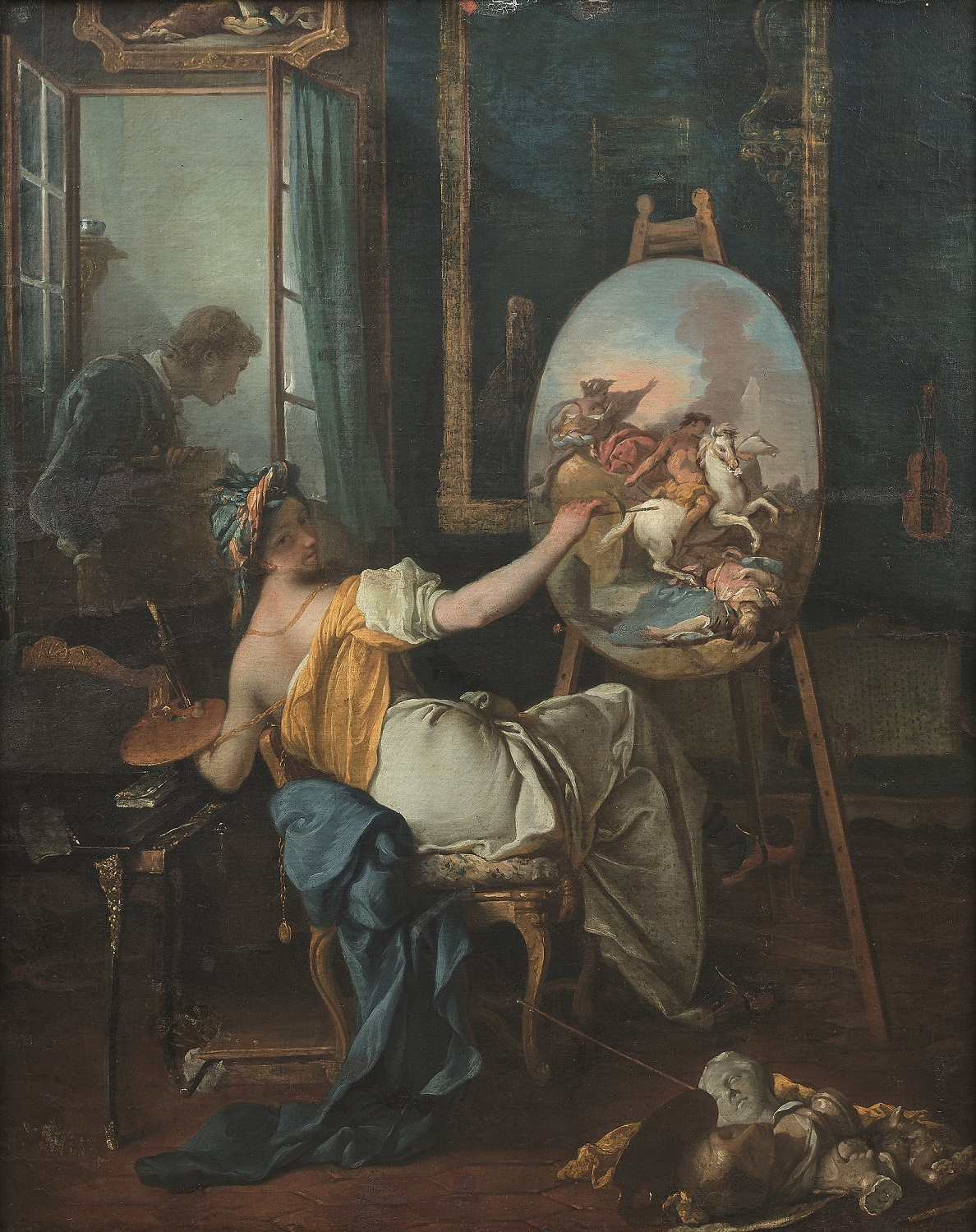
Michel-François Dandré-Bardon, La Peinture ébauchant le tableau de Tullie.

Tullia Running Her Chariot over the Body of Her Father is a 1735 painting by Michel-François Dandré-Bardon which depicts Roman princess Tullia (later Rome's last queen) running over her father King Servius Tullius's dead body with her chariot. Upon the submission of this work Bardon was accepted into the Académie royale de peinture et de sculpture.

== See also ==
- Tullia Drives over the Corpse of her Father, by Jean Bardin
- Tullia driving her Chariot over her Father, by Giuseppe Bartolomeo Chiari
- Tullia Driving her Chariot over the Body of her Father by François-Guillaume Ménageot
