= Tullia driving her Chariot over her Father =

1687 painting by Giuseppe Bartolomeo Chiari

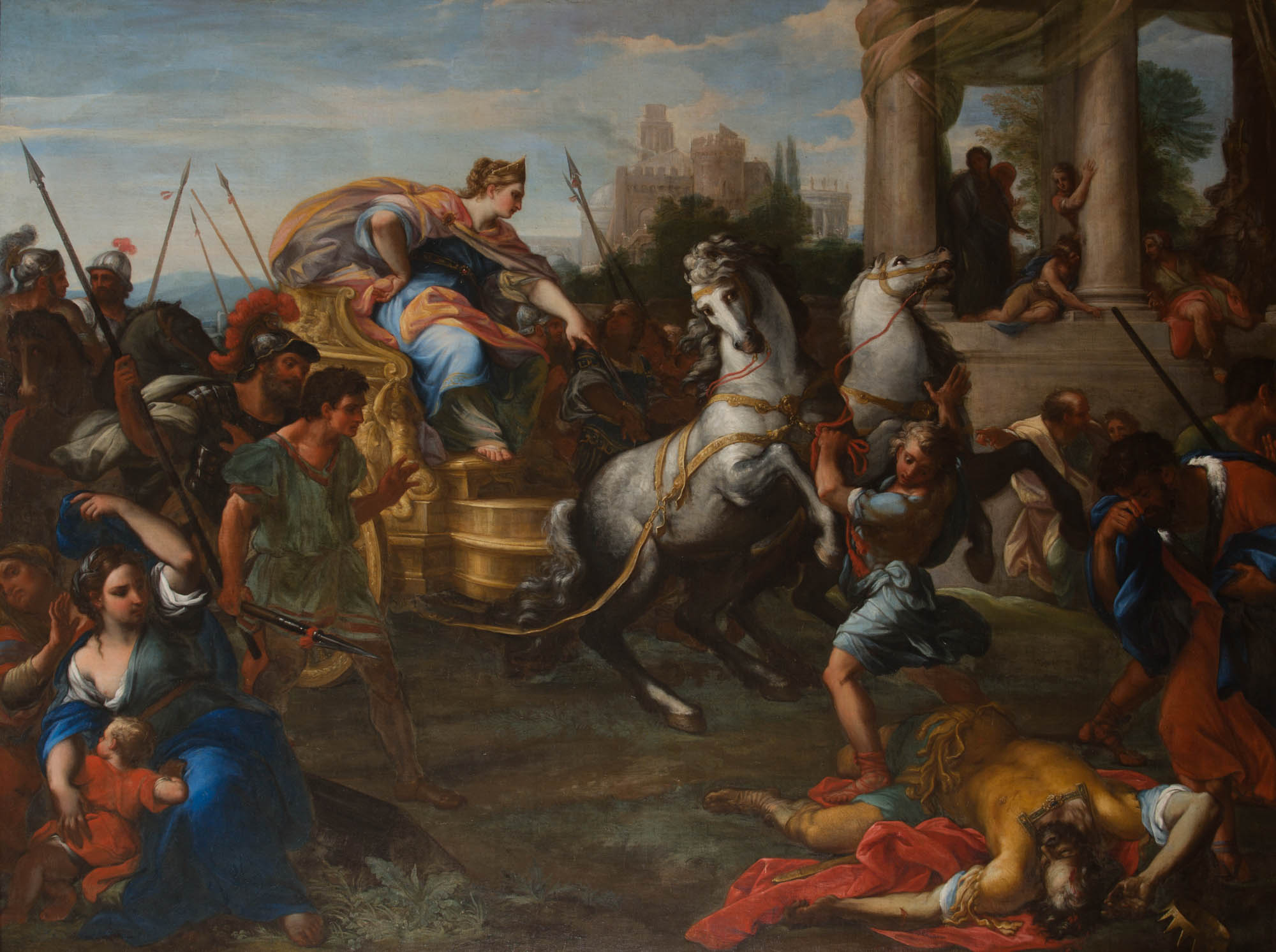
- Artist: Giuseppe Bartolomeo Chiari
- Year: 1687
- Dimensions: 165 cm × 221 cm (65 in × 87 in)
- Location: Burghley House, Stamford, Lincolnshire

Tullia driving her Chariot over her Father is a 1687 painting by Giuseppe Bartolomeo Chiari which depicts the last Queen of Rome Tullia driving her chariot over the dead body of her father, King Servius Tullius. The work was commissioned by Jacopo Montinioni and was later purchased by John Cecil, 5th Earl of Exeter after the former's death. It is held today by the Burghley House Historic Trust.

== See also ==
- Tullia Drives over the Corpse of her Father, by Jean Bardin
- Tullia Running Her Chariot over the Body of Her Father, by Michel-François Dandré-Bardon
- Tullia Driving her Chariot over the Body of her Father by François-Guillaume Ménageot
