= Tochigi patricide case =

Criminal case in japan

The Tochigi patricide case (栃木実父殺し事件, Tochigi Jippugoroshi Jiken), or Aizawa patricide case, is a landmark father–daughter incest and patricide case in Tochigi Prefecture, Japan. The trial of the incident is also known as its common case name Aizawa v. Japan. In the incident, a victimized daughter, Chiyo Aizawa (相沢 チヨ, Aizawa Chiyo) (born January 31, 1939) who had been sexually abused by her father for about 15 years, eventually killed him on October 5, 1968. She was accused and convicted of murdering her father, but her sentence was suspended.

Aizawa's controversial trial led to the repeal of parricide as an offence in the Criminal Code of Japan.

== Background and murder ==
Born in Tochigi Prefecture, Aizawa was the first of six children. Her father was Takeo Aizawa (相沢 武雄, Aizawa Takeo; May 3, 1915 – October 5, 1968) and her mother was Rika Aizawa (相沢 リカ, Aizawa Rika). Takeo was an alcoholic and systematically raped his daughter from 1953, when she was fourteen years old, onwards. Rika fled to Hokkaidō soon after, leaving Chiyo behind. She returned several years later, attempting to stop their relationship. By then, Takeo was living with his daughter, treating her as if she were his wife. Chiyo became pregnant 11 times and had five daughters by her father, two of whom died in infancy. In 1967, she underwent sterilization after her sixth abortion.

In 1968, Chiyo fell in love with a 22-year-old man, and her father became angry. He confined her and said that he would kill their three children. On October 5, 1968, she strangled her father in Yaita, Tochigi Prefecture. Her neighbours had thought Chiyo was her father's wife until her arrest, and the Japanese police then determined that her three children were sired by her father. Because the family law in Japan forbids polygamy and intermarriage between close relatives but does not forbid inbreeding, a family register recorded Chiyo's children as her father's illegitimate children.

== Aizawa v. Japan ==
The penalty for parricide was the death penalty or life imprisonment under article 200 of the Criminal Code of Japan. Justices typically accept mitigating circumstances in such incidents; Japanese laws at the time permitted two reductions in sentencing, each reduction half of the appropriate sentence, with life imprisonment reduced to a seven-year sentence when reduction is applicable. Still, the minimum sentence Aizawa would have received was three years and six months in prison, and the laws did not allow suspended sentences for terms longer than three years.

Her lawyer insisted that the murder was self-defense and that she had been insane because of the rapes. On May 29, 1969, the Utsunomiya District Court considered article 200 unconstitutional and acquitted Aizawa because the crime originated via self-defense. However, the Tokyo High Court did not concur and sentenced her to three years and six months on May 12, 1970. In a final appeal, the Supreme Court of Japan accepted the argument that imposing a harsh penalty on Aizawa would violate the principle of human equality before the law found in the constitution.

The court ruled the article unconstitutional on April 4, 1973. Aizawa was found guilty of regular homicide and received a sentence of two years and six months in prison, suspended for three years. If the court had not annulled the precedents, she could not have received a suspended sentence. She was effectively acquitted, and she worked in Utsunomiya after her release.

== Effect of her sentence ==
On April 19, 1973, the Japanese Ministry of Justice announced that Japanese murderers who had killed their parents could be individually granted amnesty. Article 200 of the penal code was abolished in 1995.

== See also ==
- Child sexual abuse
- Judicial review
- Utthalum
- Cases of children imprisoned by relatives
