= Tullia Driving her Chariot over the Body of her Father =

Painting by François-Guillaume Ménageot

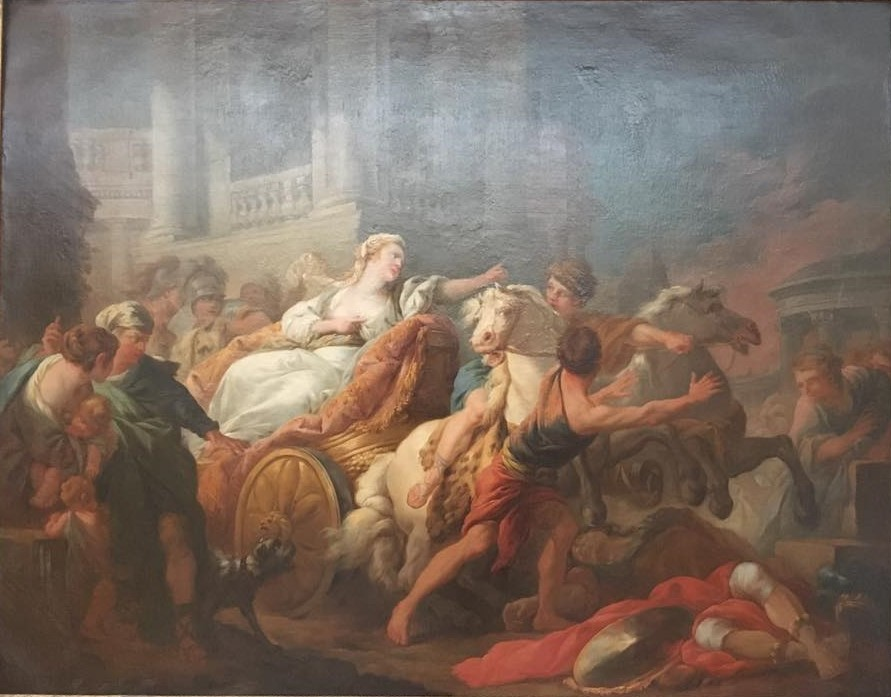
- Artist: François-Guillaume Ménageot
- Year: 1765
- Location: Museum of Fine Arts of Nancy

Tullia Driving her Chariot over the Body of her Father is a 1765 painting by François-Guillaume Ménageot which depicts the Roman princess Tullia driving her chariot over the dead body of her father, the king Servius Tullius. The painting won second prize at the Prix de Rome.

== See also ==
- Tullia Drives over the Corpse of her Father, by Jean Bardin
- Tullia driving her Chariot over her Father, by Giuseppe Bartolomeo Chiari
- Tullia Running Her Chariot over the Body of Her Father, by Michel-François Dandré-Bardon
