= Tullia (play) =

1533 Italian play by Lodovico Martelli

Tullia is a 1533 Italian play by Lodovico Martelli about the Roman queen Tullia Minor. The play is an example of an extreme imitation of classical Greek theater. The play features a 212-line monologue, (where Lucius Tarquinius Superbus reveals himself to Tullia) making it one of the longest in Renaissance tragedy.
