= Michel-François Dandré-Bardon =

French painter

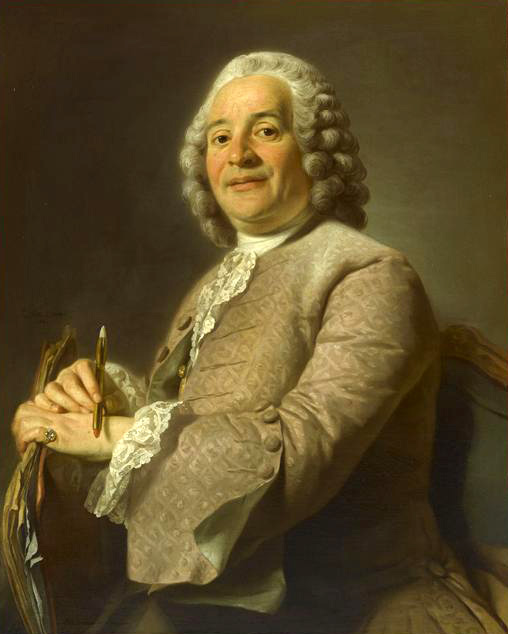
Portrait by Alexander Roslin, 1756

Michel François André-Bardon (French pronunciation: [miʃɛl fʁɑ̃swa ɑ̃dʁe baʁdɔ̃]; 22 May 1700 – 13 April 1785) was a French history painter and etcher.

== Biography ==
=== Early life ===
He was born in Aix-en-Provence, France. He signed his name Dandré-Bardon, or D. Bardon, because his uncle, Louis Bardon, made him his heir on condition that he continued the name of Bardon; but his real name was André, as the registers of the church of St. Madeleine testify. Michel François was destined by his parents for jurisprudence, and studied at Paris.

=== Career ===
In 1719, he began to design during his leisure hours under the direction of Jean-Baptiste van Loo, and studied painting with J. F. de Troy. His progress was so rapid, that he obtained, in 1725, the second prize at the Royal Academy. He went afterwards to Rome, and after being there six years he returned to France, through Venice, where he stayed six months. He painted the Palais-de-Justice, the Hôtel-de-Ville (which perished in 1792), and the church of St. Jerome, at Aix. The work which he executed of Jason ploughing, intended for the tapestry manufactory at Beauvais, has disappeared.

== As a writer ==
He went to Paris, where he displayed his talents, not only as a painter and etcher, but also as a poet and writer. In 1735, he became a member of the Academy; in 1752 professor; afterwards secretary; and finally teacher of historical painting. He was also the founder of the Académie des Beaux-Arts at Marseilles. He designed with great facility, and was a perfect master in representing the nude.

=== Death ===
He died in Paris in 1785.

== Partial list of works ==
=== Paintings ===
- The Emperor Augustus ordering the punishment of the robbers of the State money (Signed Dandré-Bardon aquisextiensis pinxit Romae Aetat. Suae 29 Anno 1729; Aix Museum).
- Allegorical Figures of the Virtues (Palais-de-Justice).
- Christ on the Cross (Marseilles. Mus.).
- Tullia Running Her Chariot over the Body of Her Father (Montpellier. Mus.).

=== Etchings ===
- The Dead Body of Christ.
- Two Dead Children at the entrance of a vault.
- The Burial of the Dead.
- Johannes Snellinks; after Van Dijck.

== Gallery ==
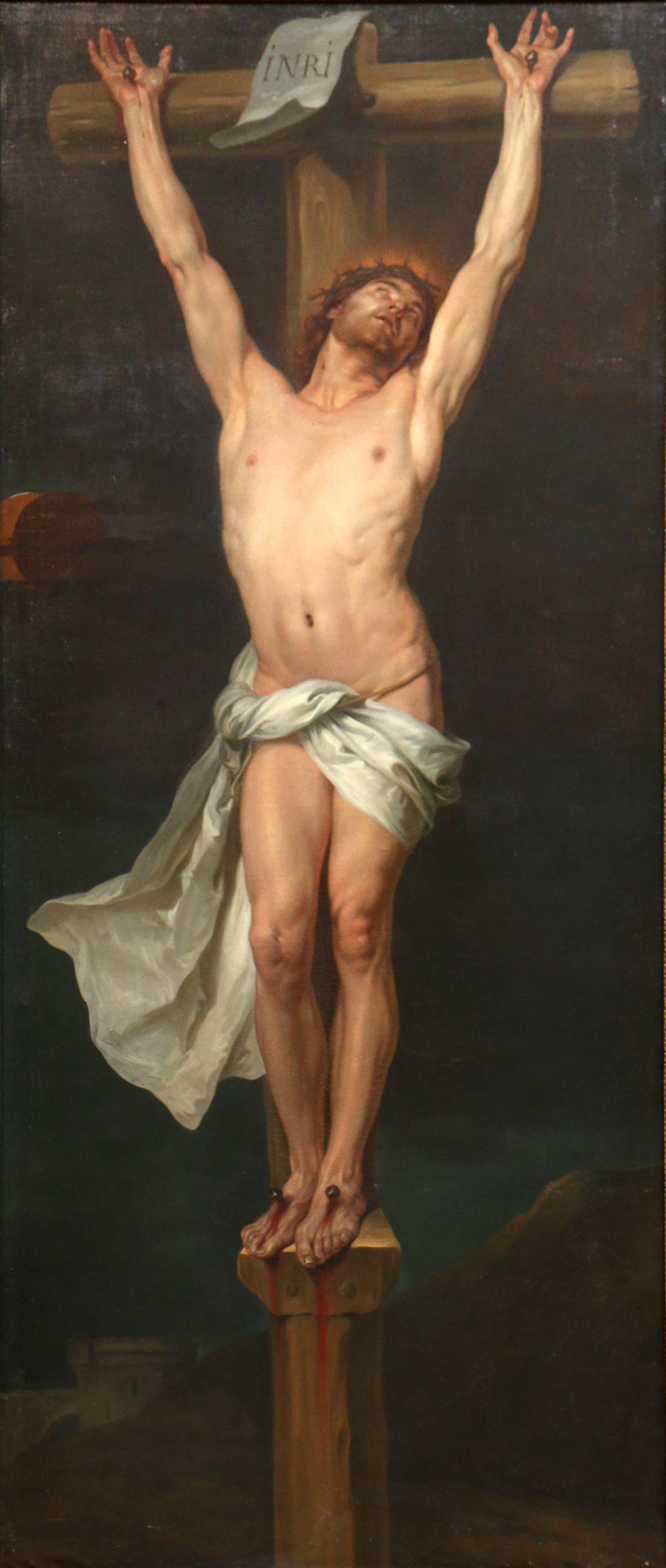
Depiction of Christ on the Cross, Eglise du Saint-Esprit à Aix-en-Provence

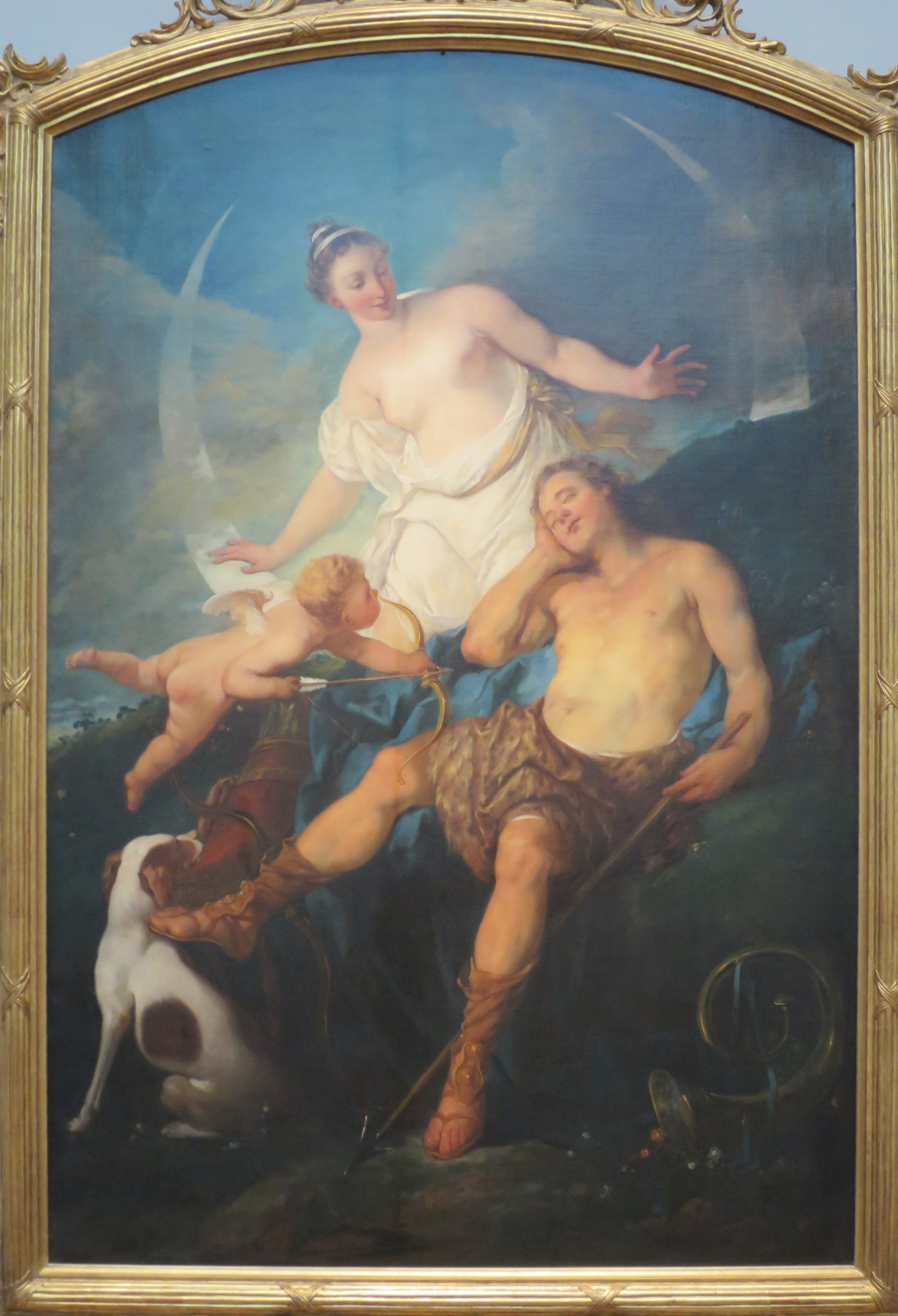
Diana and Endymion, 1726

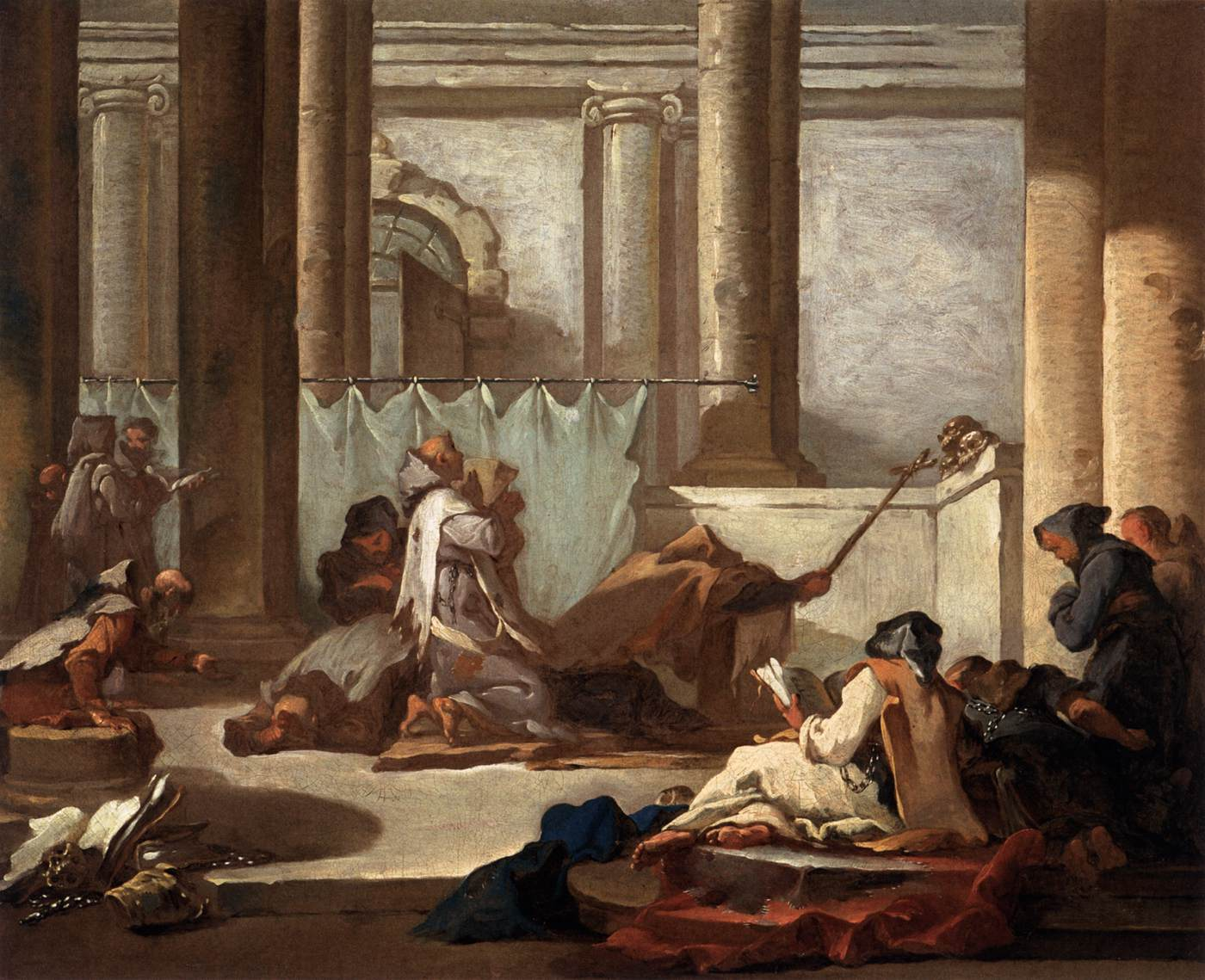
Adoration des cranes, 1733

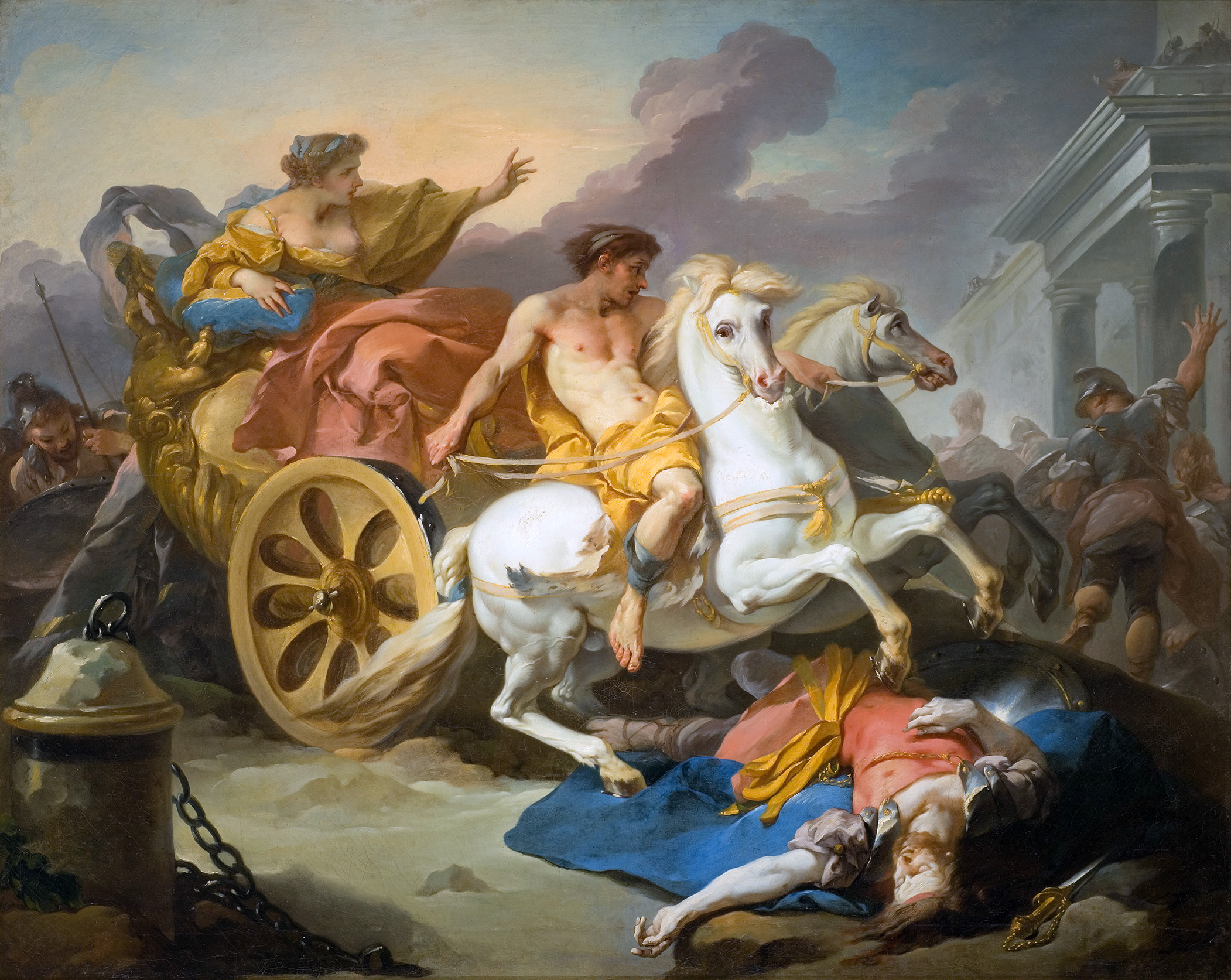
Tullie, 1735

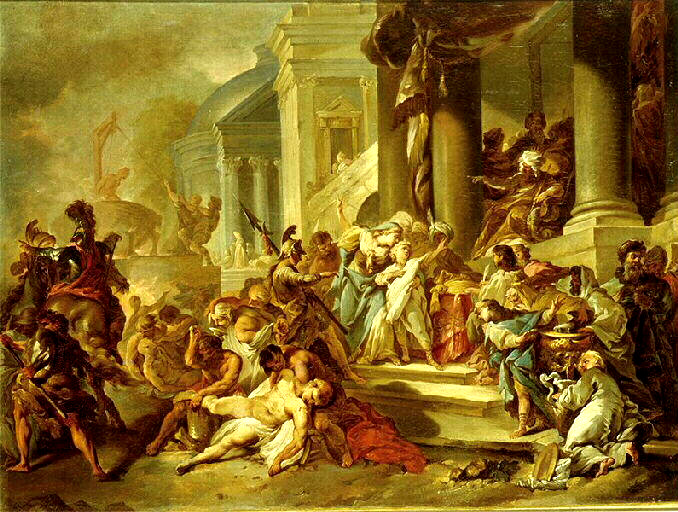
Anthichos

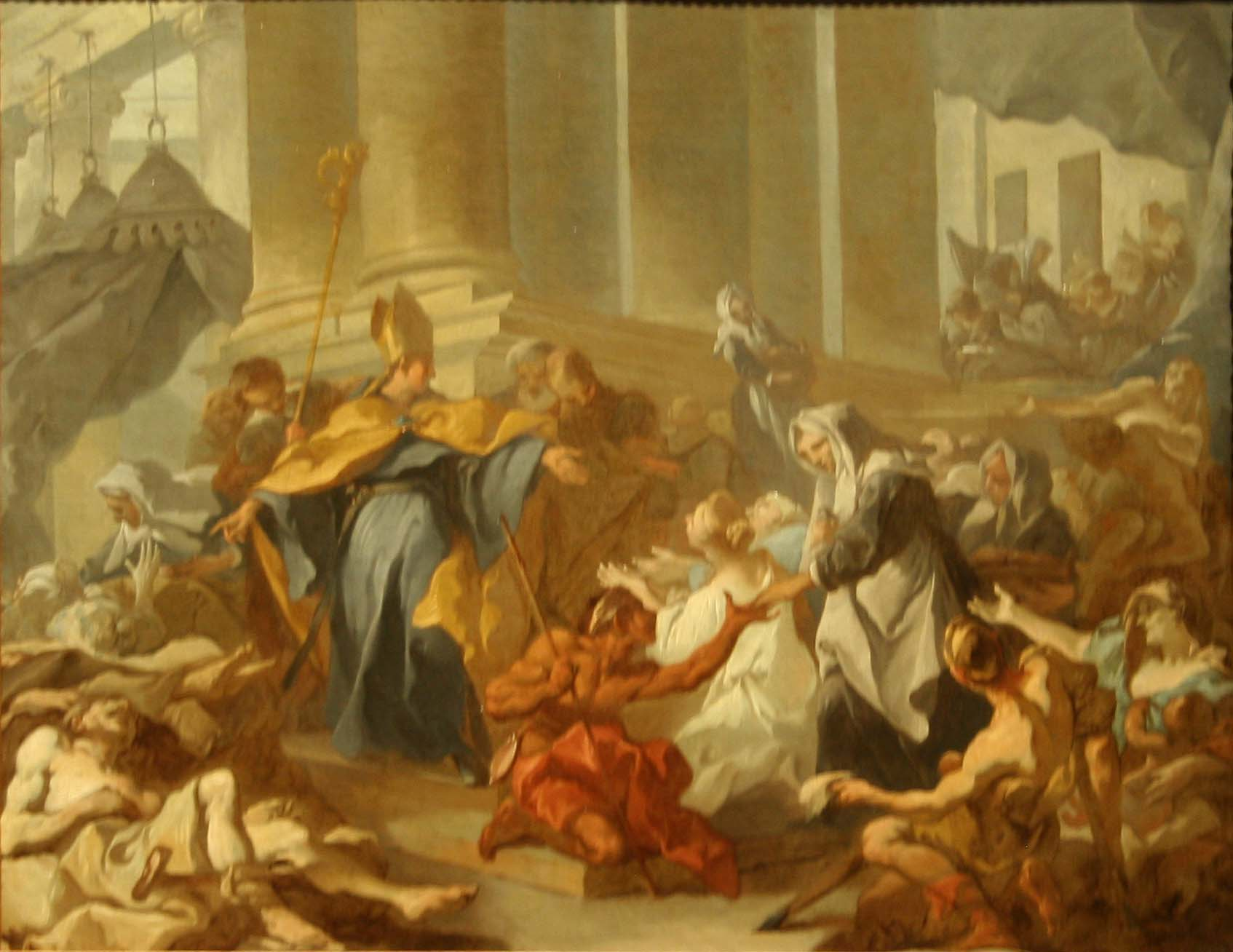
The Good Works of the Children of Saint-Thomas de Villeneuve

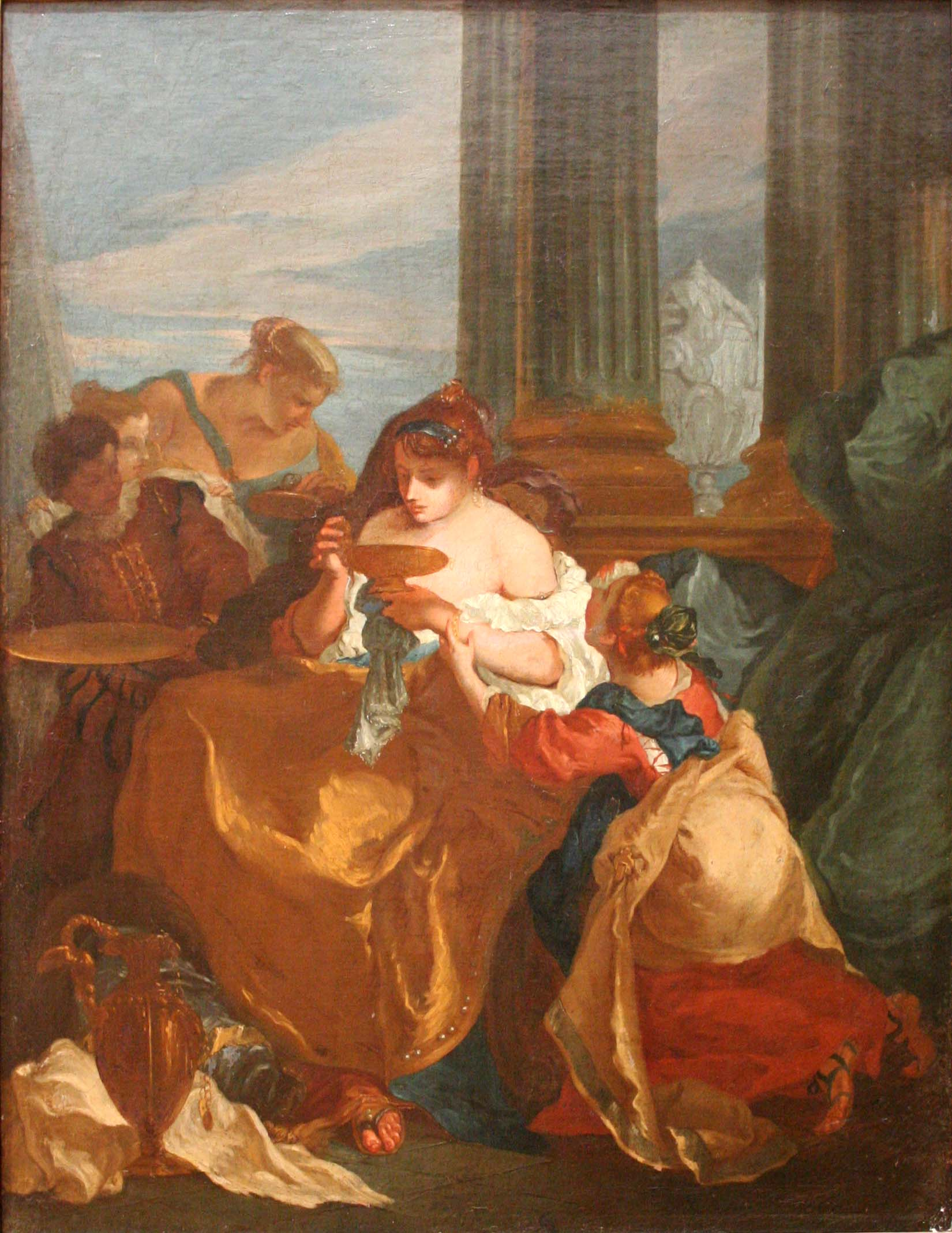
Sophonisbe
