= Giuseppe Bartolomeo Chiari =

Italian painter (1654–1727)

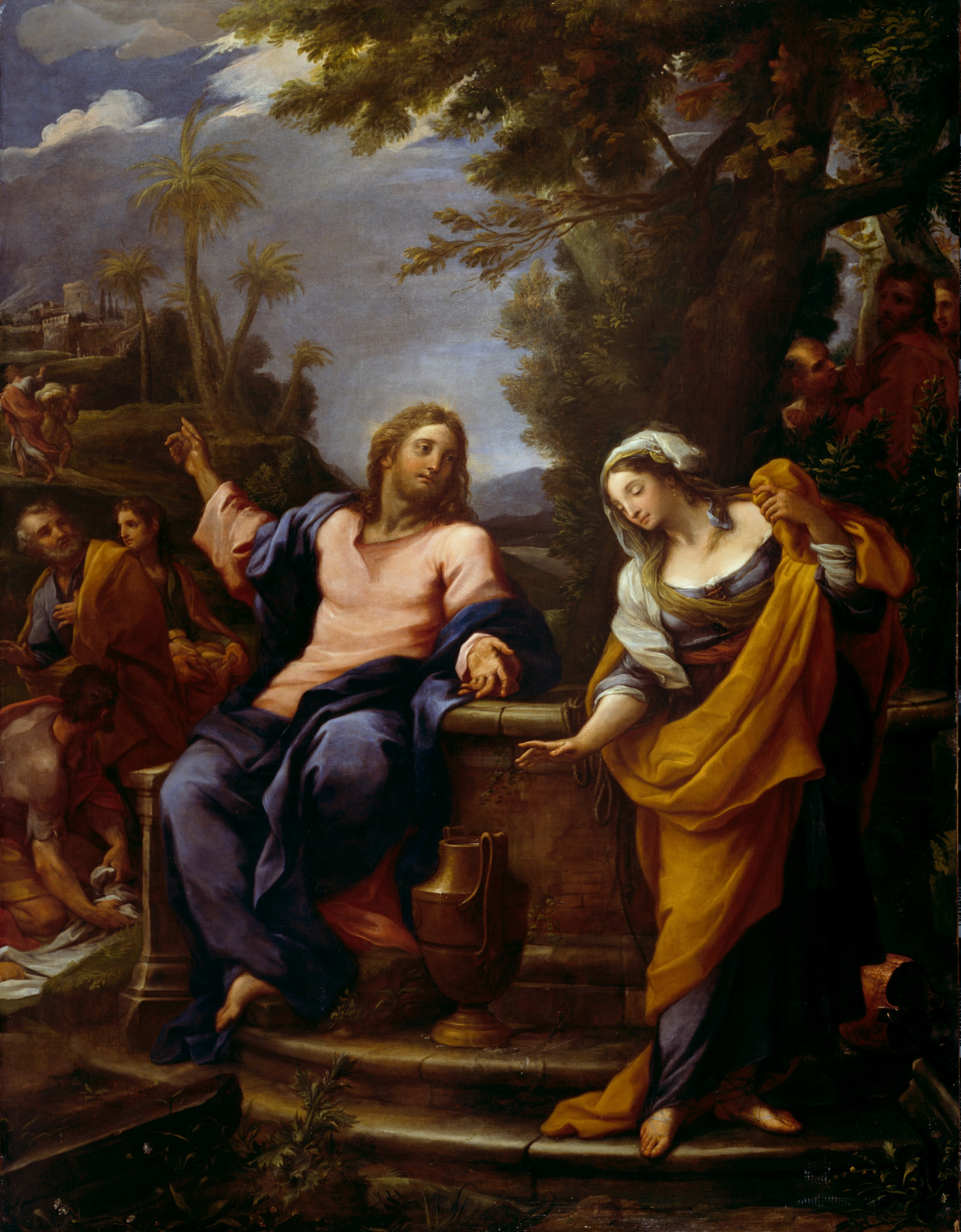
- Christ and the Samaritan Woman, Museum of Fine Arts, Houston
- Born: 16 March 1654; Rome, Papal States
- Died: 8 September 1727 (aged 73); Rome, Papal States
- Education: Carlo Maratta
- Known for: Painting
- Notable work: Tullia driving her Chariot over her Father (1687)
- Movement: Baroque
- Patrons: Pope Clement XI

Giuseppe Bartolomeo Chiari (10 March 1654 – 8 September 1727), also known as simply Giuseppe Chiari, was an Italian painter of the late-Baroque period, active mostly in Rome.

== Biography ==
=== Early career ===
Born in Rome, he was one of the main assistants, along with Giuseppe Passeri and Andrea Procaccini, in the studio of an elder Carlo Maratta. His father had opposed the career, but his mother, on the recommendation of a painter named Carlo Antonio Gagliani. By the age of 22, he had frescoed the lateral lunettes (Birth of Virgin and Adoration of Magi) of the Marcaccioni chapel in the church of Santa Maria del Suffragio. He also painted the ceiling of a chapel in Santa Maria in Cosmedin. In 1686 Chiari decorated the vault of the chapel of the Montioni in Santa Maria in Montesanto, Rome, with an Assumption and at about the same time, also for Jacopo Montioni (d. 1687), painted two canvases showing scenes from Roman history: Coriolanus before the Walls of Rome and Tullia driving her Chariot over her Father (Burghley House, Cambridgeshire).

=== Career ===
In 1693 he frescoed rooms in the Palazzo Barberini to allegorical sketches of Bellori of Aurora leading Apollo and chariot with time and seasons with extensive interweaving of heraldic symbols, including bees (symbol of Barberini); two-headed eagle alighting on globe with blue and white stripes (symbol of the family of Vittorio Ottoboni; crossed keys under baldachin (symbol of Pope Alexander VIII); a golden fleece (symbol of award given to Taddeo Barberini; a column (symbol of the Colonna family); sun and laurels (symbols of Urban VIII), and post (symbols of the Pignatelli family).

From 1695 to 1696 he worked in the chapel of the Teddalini–Bentivoglio in San Silvestro in Capite, Rome, where his altarpiece, side pictures and vault fresco achieve an impressive unity. Chiari’s largest fresco was painted c. 1700 in the Palazzo Colonna: Hercules Introducing Marcantonio Colonna to Olympus. In 1708 he painted four scenes from Ovid’s Metamorphoses (Rome, Galleria Spada) for Cardinal Fabrizio Spada, which are among his finest cabinet pictures of mythological themes, and which transform Maratta’s severity into elegance. He additionally frescoed the Villa Torri outside of Porta San Pancrazio in collaboration with landscape artist Jan van Bloemen. Christ and the Woman of Samaria (Bückeburg, Schloss Bückeburg) was acquired c. 1712 by Graf Christian Schaumburg-Lippe, who had bought works by Chiari since 1685.

Also from c. 1712 date the Ecstasy of St. Lucy of Narni (Sant'Ignazio, Rome) and the ceiling fresco Angels Making Music (Rome, Sant'Andrea al Quirinale). There followed, in 1714, the Adoration of the Magi (Dresden, Gemäldegalerie Alte Meister), for Cardinal Pietro Ottoboni, and, shortly afterwards, an elegant version of the same subject (Gemäldegalerie, Berlin).

=== Under Pope Clement XI ===
In the early years of the 18th century Pope Clement XI became Chiari’s most important patron. Papal commissions included the vast ceiling picture, painted on canvas, in the nave of San Clemente al Laterano depicting the Glory of St. Clement (c. 1715) and one of the 12 oval paintings of Old Testament Prophets (commissioned 1718) for the nave of Saint John Lateran. The Pope also commissioned the Allegory on the Papacy (Frascati, Episcopio; second version, Rome, Galleria dell'Accademia Nazionale di San Luca), intended as a gift for the Old Pretender, James Francis Edward Stuart. Chiari was Principe of the Accademia di San Luca, Rome, from 1722 to 1725.

=== Late work ===
Chiari’s late works include St. Peter of Alcántara and St. Paschal Baylon (c. 1725) in San Francesco a Ripa, the two side paintings and the vault fresco with scenes from the Life of St. Francis of Paola (c. 1726) in San Francesco di Paola ai Monti (modelli for the side pictures, Rome, Galleria Colonna and Galleria Pallavicini) and the large altarpiece of the Ecstasy of St. Francis (c. 1726) in Santi Apostoli, Rome. Chiari’s brother Tommaso Chiari (1665–1733) collaborated with him on the two late altarpieces St. Peter Receiving the Keys (Zagarolo, San Pietro) and the Ecstasy of St Mary Magdalene (Zagarolo, San Lorenzo), commissioned by the Rospigliosi family. Pascoli stated that the Holy Family with St. John the Baptist in Santa Maria delle Grazie alle Fornaci fuori Porta Cavalleggeri, Rome, was Chiari’s last work. Chiari died in Rome on 8 September 1727. William Kent, Paolo Anesi, and Giovanni Andrea Lazzarini were amonghis pupils. His studio is described as highly frequented by French artists.

== Partial anthology of works in Rome ==
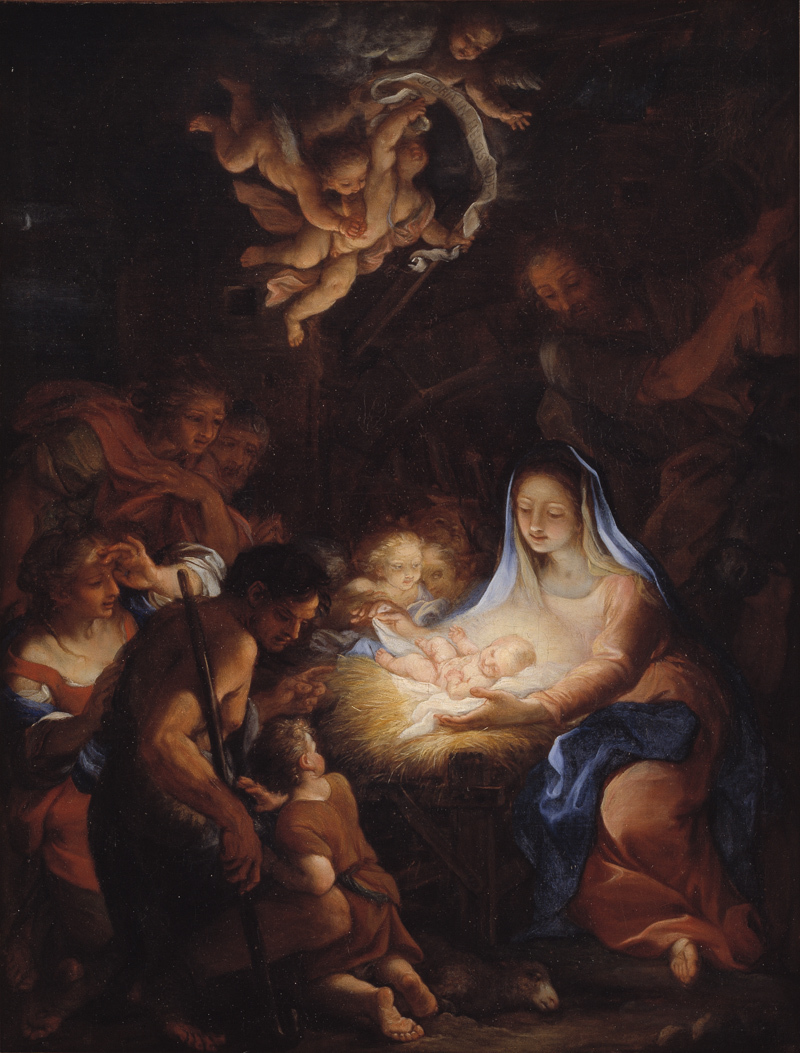
The Adoration of the Shepherds, National Gallery of Denmark, Copenhagen

- Adoration by Magi & Birth of Mary, 3rd chapel on right of Santa Maria del Suffragio.
- Apotheosis of Marcantonio II Colonna, ceiling fresco of Sala delle Colonne Belliche of Palazzo Colonna.
- Solar Carriage, Galleria Nazionale d'Arte Antica.
- Decoration of ceiling in piano nobile of Palazzo De Carolis.
- Decoration of lunettes in 2nd chapel on right in Sant'Ignazio.
- Judith and head of Holoferne and Allegories of Clement XI papacy, Museo di Roma in Palazzo Braschi.
- Glory of the Virgin, ceiling frescoes of 3rd chapel on left in Santa Maria del Montesanto.
- Glory of Angels, Chapel of Founders, Sant'Andrea al Quirinale.
- Glory of San Clemente, ceiling frescoes of upper basilica of San Clemente.
- Bacchus & Ariadne, Palazzo Spada.
- Madonna, child, & Saints Anthony of Padua & Stefano I. San Silvestro in Capite.
- Miracles of St. Francesco di Paola, wall and ceiling frescoes on 2nd chapel to right of San Francesco di Paola
- Profeta Abdia, painted in oval over aedicule of nave in Basilica di San Giovanni
- San Francesco surrounded by Angels, Santi Apostoli, Rome.
- Holy Family and young John the Baptist, Santa Maria alle Grazie delle Fornaci.
- Saints Peter of Alcantara and Pasquale Baylon, San Francesco a Ripa.
- Tullia driving her Chariot over her Father, Burghley House, Cambridgeshire
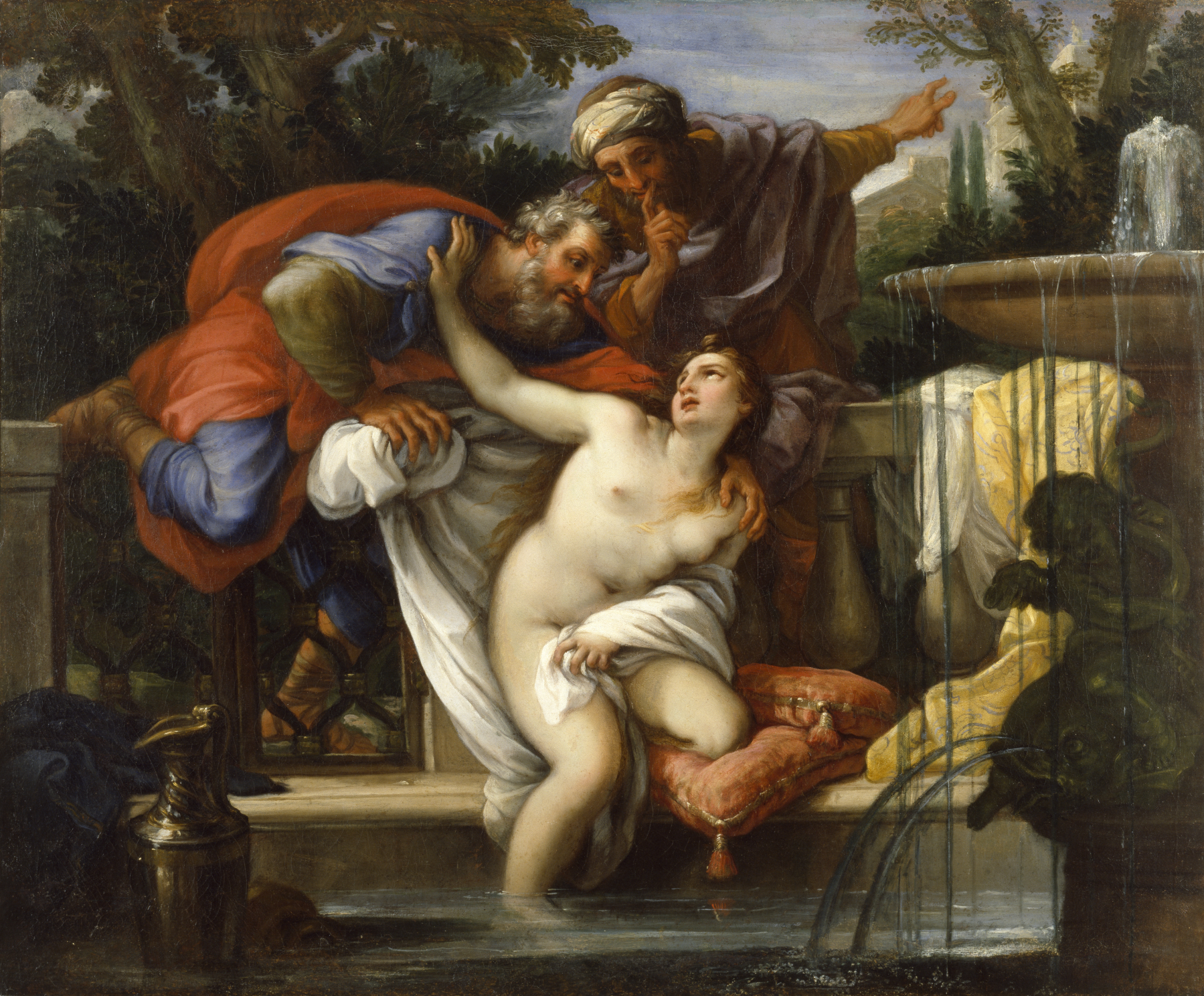
Susanna and the Elders, 1690, Walters Art Museum, Baltimore

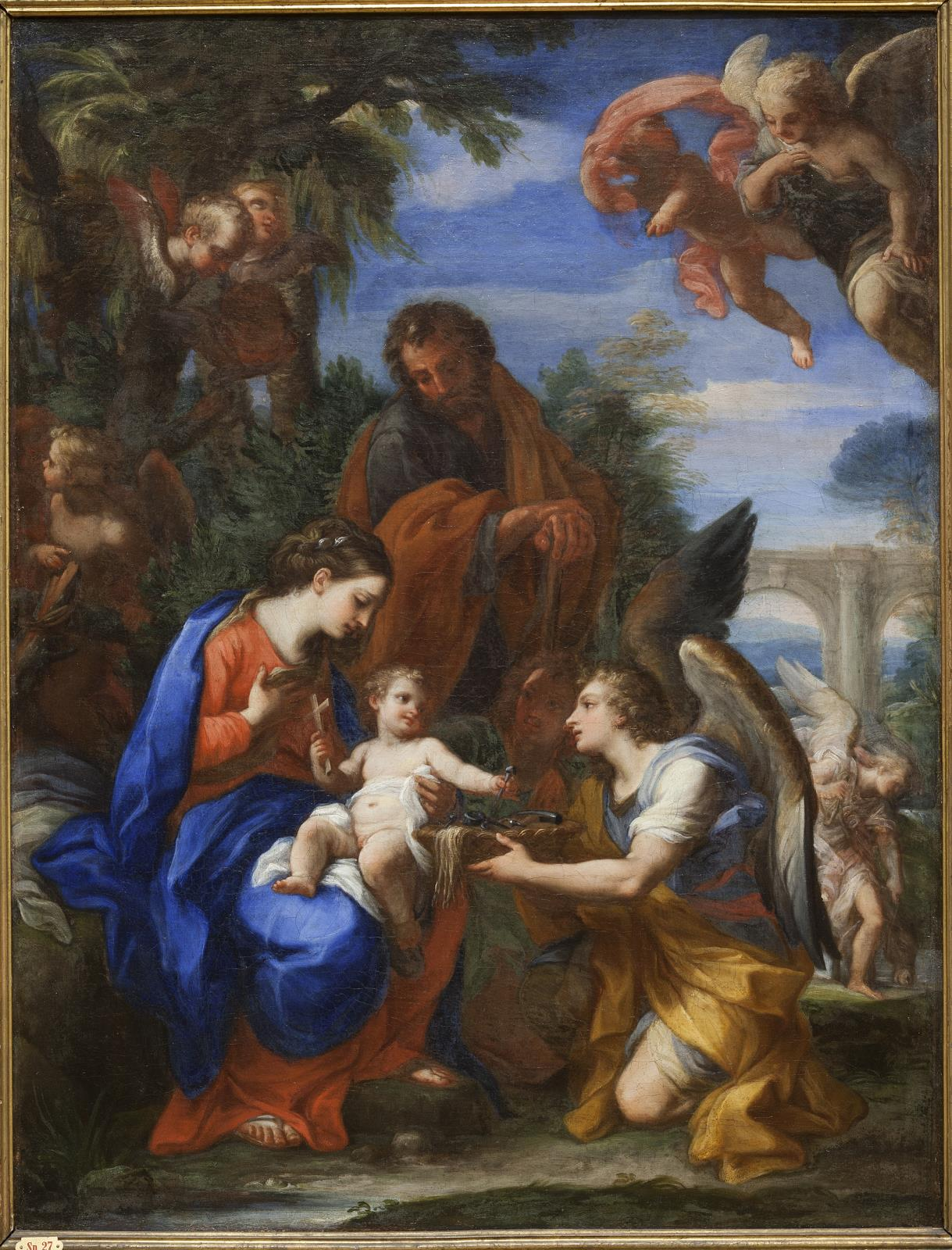
Rest on the Flight into Egypt, 1704, National Gallery of Denmark, Copenhagen

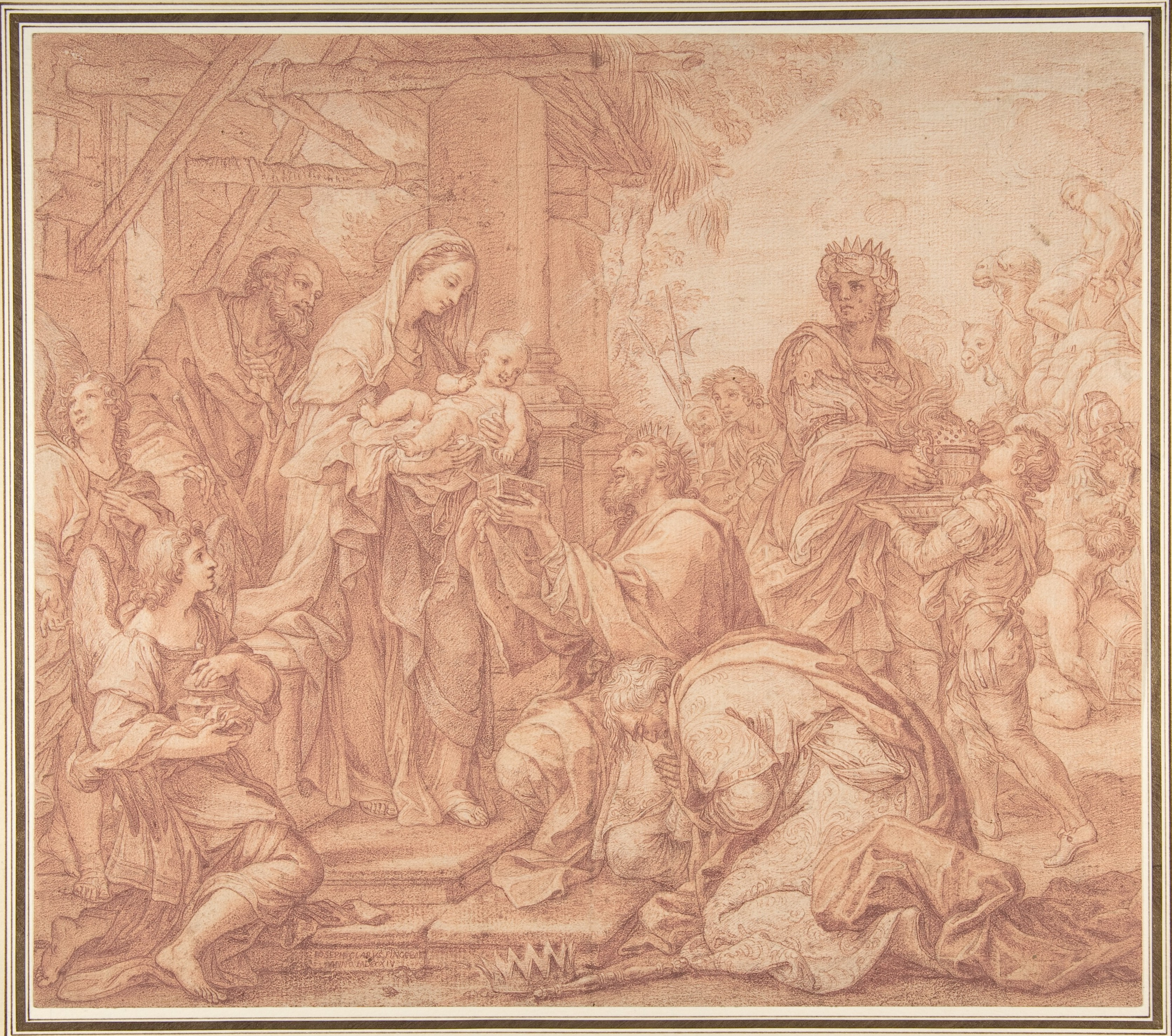
The Adoration of the Magi, Metropolitan Museum of Art, New York

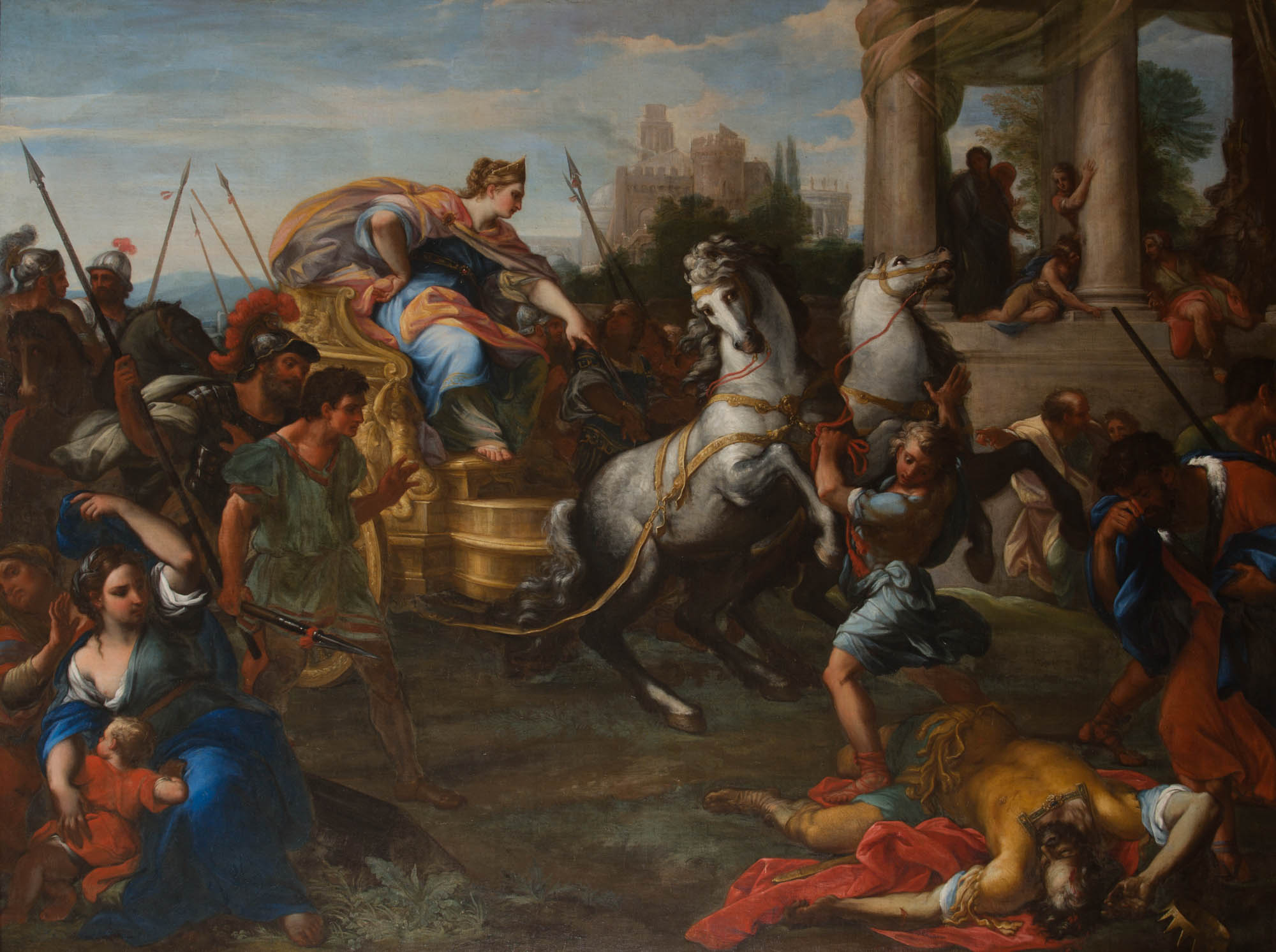
Tullia driving her Chariot over her Father, 1687, Burghley House, Cambridgeshire

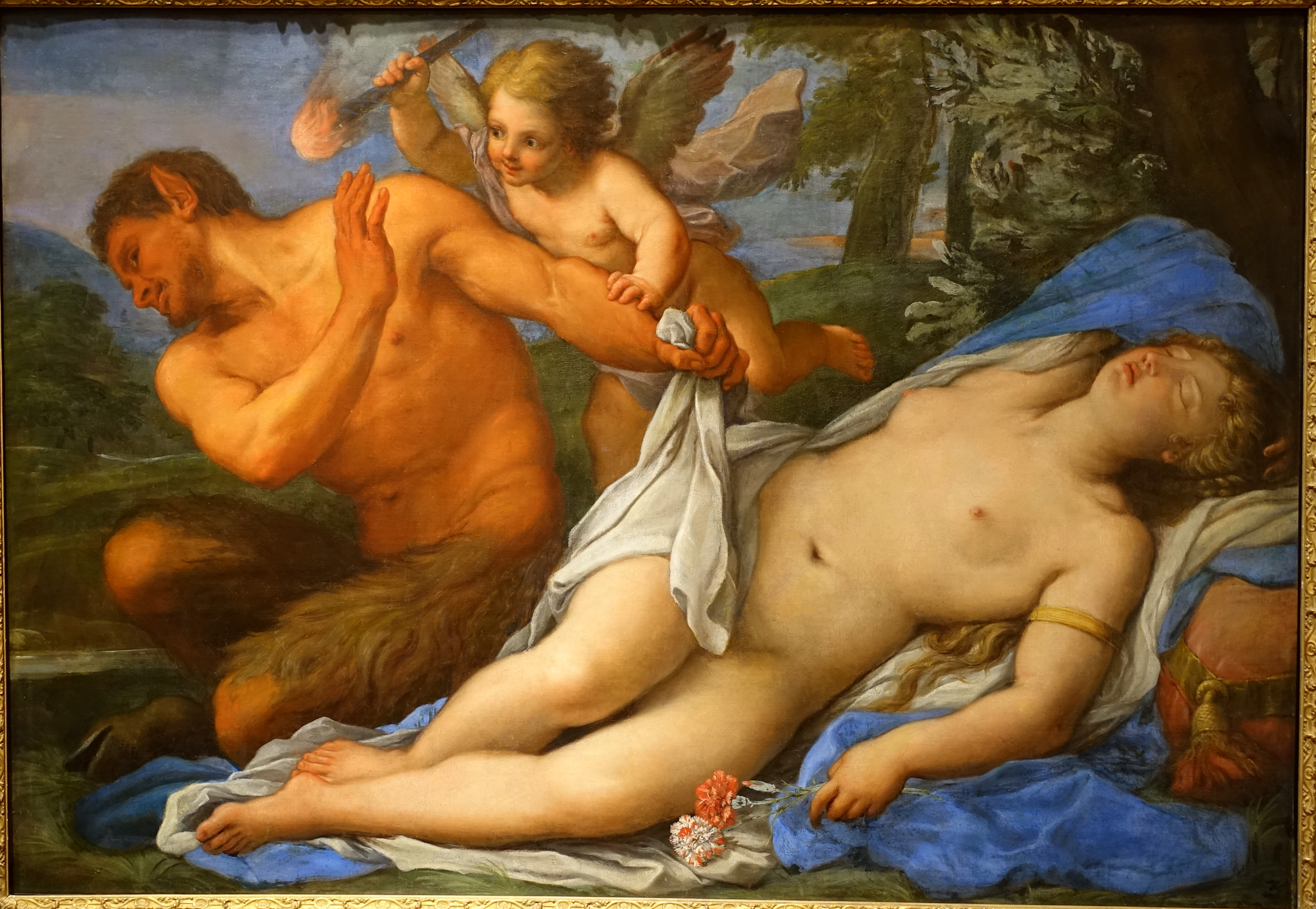
Cupid Inciting a Satyr, John and Mable Ringling Museum of Art, Sarasota

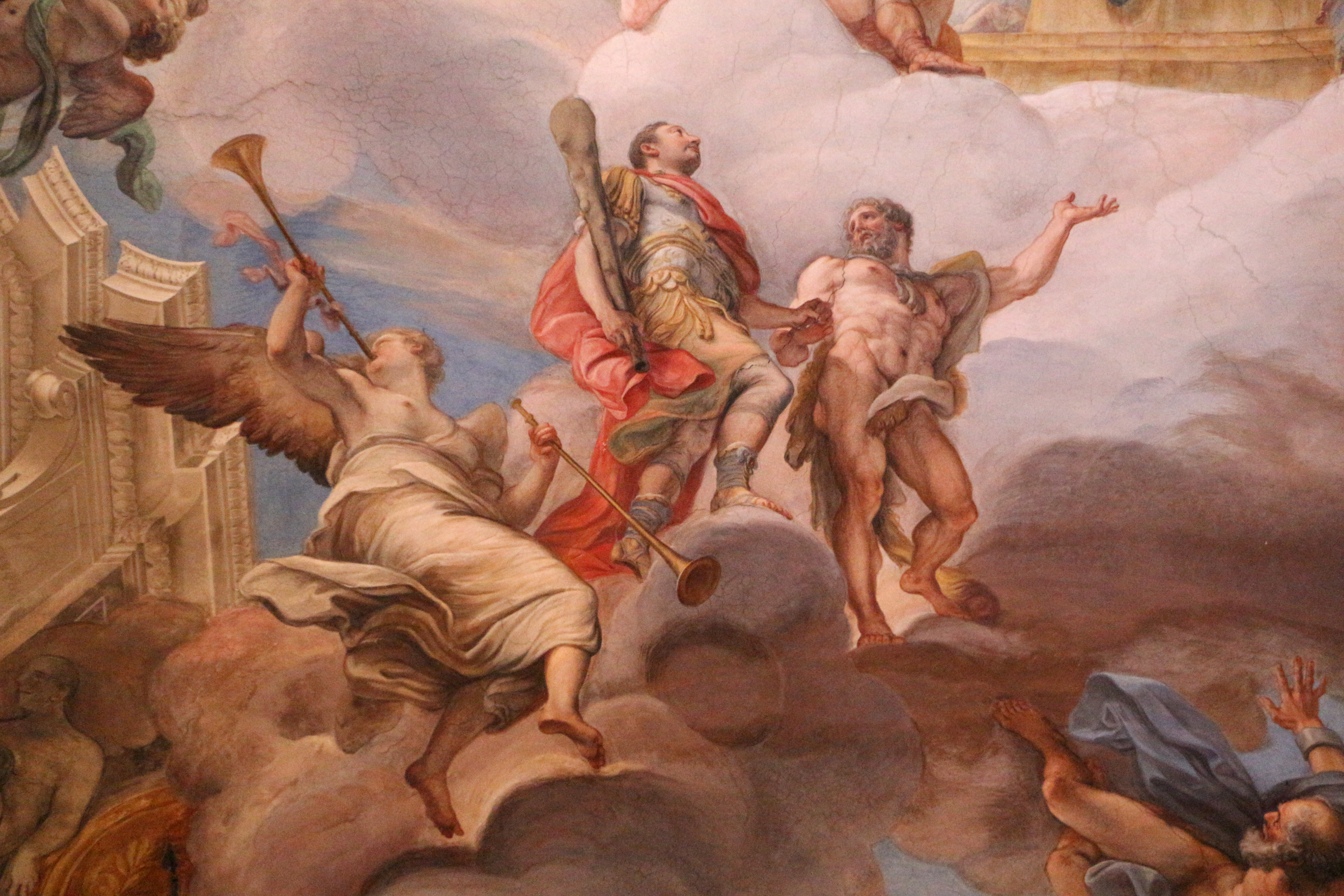
Apotheosis of Marcantonio Colonna (Detail), Palazzo Colonna, Rome

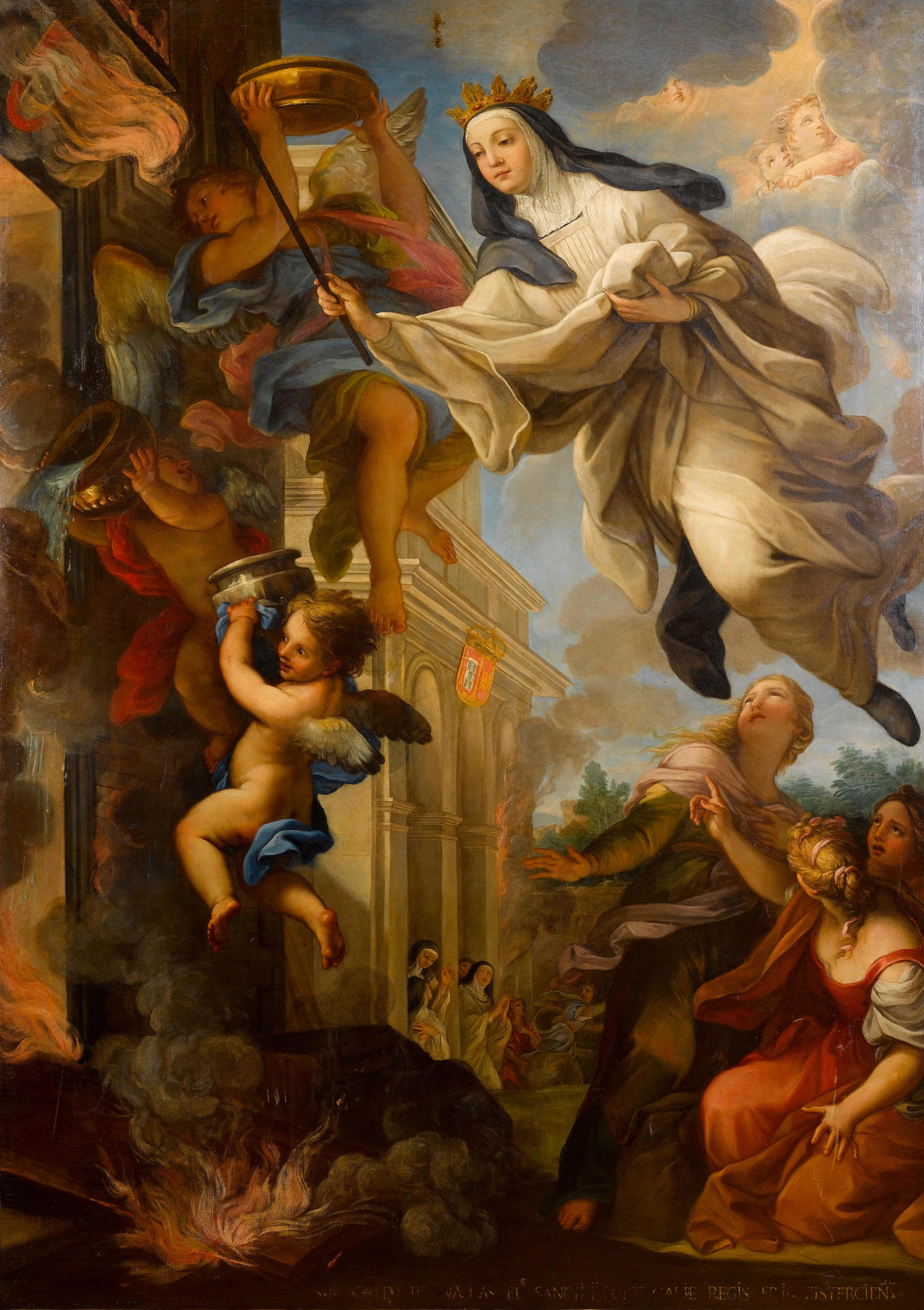
Miracle of the Blessed Mafalda, priv. col.

== See also ==
- Sebastiano Conca
- Accademia di San Luca
- Jacopo Zoboli
- Pompeo Batoni

== Sources ==
- Missirini, Melchiorre (1823). Memorie per servire alla storia della romana Accademia di San Luca. Rome: De Romanis.
- Kerber, Bernhard; Franciscono, Renate (1968). "Giuseppe Bartolomeo Chiari". The Art Bulletin. 50 (1): 75–86. doi:10.2307/3048516.
