= François-Guillaume Ménageot =

French painter (1744–1816)

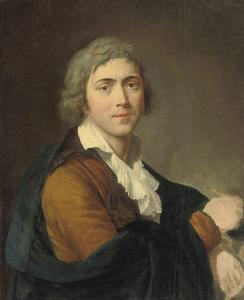
Self portrait (before 1800)

François-Guillaume Ménageot (French: [fʁɑ̃swa ɡijom menaʒo]; 1744–1816) was a French painter of religious and French historical scenes. A pupil of François Boucher (1703–1770), he went on to win the Grand Prix de Rome and become a director of the French Academy in Rome, an academician and a member of the Institute.

== Biography ==
Ménageot was born in London, the son of Augustin Ménageot (d 1784), an art dealer and adviser to Denis Diderot. François-Guillaume trained under first Jean-Baptiste-Henri Deshays, then Joseph-Marie Vien, and finally François Boucher (1703–1770), in his early works adopting the latter's style and use of warm, light colours. His 1766 Tomyris Plunging the Head of Cyrus into a Bowl of Blood (Paris, Ecole Normale Supérieure des Beaux-Arts) won the Prix de Rome and a stay at the French Academy in Rome from 1769 to 1774.

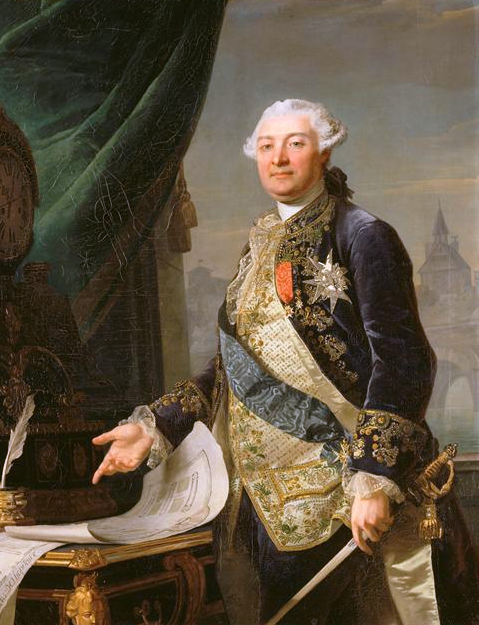
Portrait of Louis Auguste Le Tonnelier de Breteuil

The Académie Royale in Paris approved François-Guillaume as a history painter in 1777, and he then exhibited The Farewells of Polyxena to Hecuba (Chartres, Musée des Beaux-Arts) at the Salon, and it received a good reception, as did his entrance piece Learning Resisting the Passage of Time (1780; Paris, Ecole Normale Supérieure des Beaux-Arts) and his 1781 Death of Leonardo da Vinci in the Arms of Francis I (Amboise, Hôtel de Ville). He and other painters led French painting to return to the Grand Style, with more horizontal compositions, more sculptural drapery, colder colouring and set in ever more monumental architecture. He died in Paris.

== Works ==
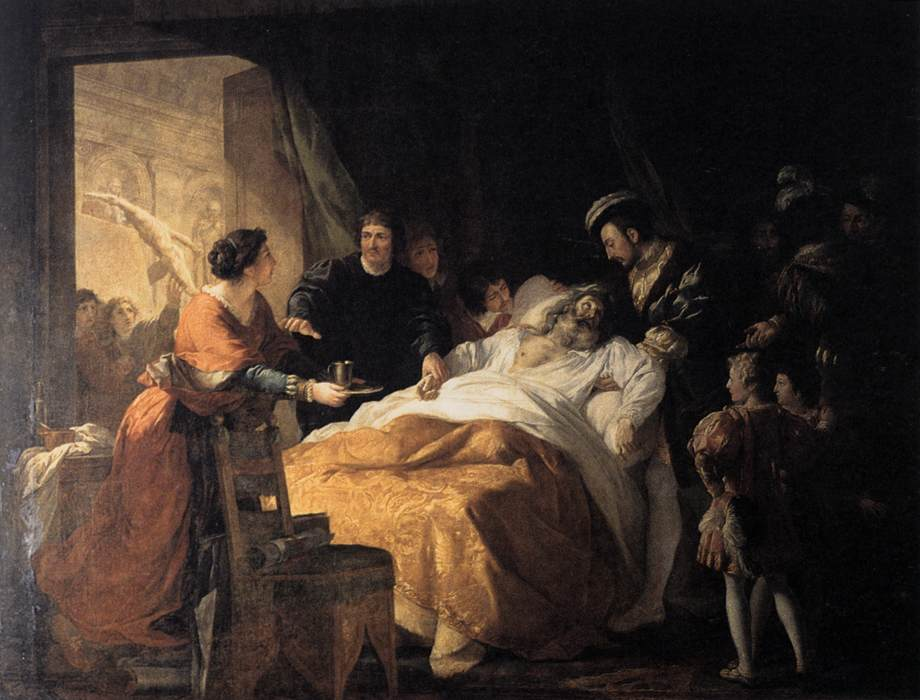
Death of Leonardo da Vinci (now at the observatory and museum of Amboise).

- Tomyris Plunging the Head of Cyrus into a Bowl of Blood (1766; Paris, Ecole Normale Supérieure des Beaux-Arts)
- The Farewells of Polyxena to Hecuba (1777; Chartres, Musée des Beaux-Arts)
- The Plague of Jerusalem (1779; Douai, Collégiale Saint-Pierre)
- Learning Resisting the Passage of Time (1780; Paris, Ecole Normale Supérieure des Beaux-Arts)
- Death of Leonardo da Vinci in the Arms of Francis I (1781; Amboise, Hôtel de Ville)
- Astyanax Torn from the Arms of Andromache (1783, Angers, Musée des Beaux-Arts)
- Cleopatra Paying her Last Respects to Anthony (1785; Angers, Musée des Beaux-Arts)
- The Continence of Scipio (1787; Zidlochovice Museum)
- Meleager Implored by his Family (1789; Paris, Louvre)
- Adoration of the shepherds, church of Villeneuve-sur-Yonne
- Adoration of the shepherds, church of Saint-Eustache, Paris
- Hercules at Rest
- Wedding of A uguste Amalie von Bayern with Eugène de Beauharnais, in the Residence in Munich on 13 Jan. 1806
- Tullia Driving her Chariot over the Body of her Father

== Sources ==
- Dr. Jean-Pierre Lafouge on Ménageot's The Martyrdom of Saint Sebastian
- Biography on WGA
