= Utthalum =

Thai legal term

Utthalum (Thai: อุทลุม) is a Thai word and legal term meaning "immoral, unconventional, ingrate, against the custom".

The term refers to people who enter a case against their own parents or grandparents, or known in Thai as "khon utthalum" (Thai: คนอุทลุม; "utthalum person"). It also refers to a case brought by an utthalum person, called in Thai "khadi utthalum" (Thai: คดีอุทลุม; "utthalum case").

Ancient Thai law, the Law of Case Admission (พระไอยการลักษณะรับฟ้อง) under the Three Seals Law (กฎหมายตราสามดวง), prescribed:

"Section 21. A case shall be dismissed if it is instituted by an utthalum person, that is, a person who never appreciates the kindness of his/her own father, mother, grandfather or grandmother, and accuses the latter before any sort of court.

Section 25. Any person who is utthalum, that is, a person who never appreciates the kindness of his/her own father, mother, grandfather or grandmother, and accuses the latter before any sort of court, shall be punished with flagellation, in order that such evil deed will not be followed by others. Also, the case brought by him shall never be taken up."

Later in the codification of the Civil and Commercial Code, the drafting committee resolved to derive certain rules of virtue from the Three Seals Law, including the principle of utthalum. The Civil and Commercial Code, Book 5: Family, Title 2: Parent and Child, Part 2: Rights and Duties of Parent and Child, which is in force still, prescribes:

"Section 1562. No person may enter a case, either civil or criminal, against any of his or her own ascendants. The public prosecutor may, however, take up the case upon application of such person or his or her close relative."

As Section 1562 results in the restriction of rights of persons, Thai courts tend to interpret that the term "ascendant" (Thai: บุพการี; RTGS: bupphakari; from Sanskrit, purvakarī, or Pāli, pubbakarī, "one who nurtures another first") does not cover adoptive parents or grandparents.
