= Jean Bardin =

French historical painter (1732–1809)

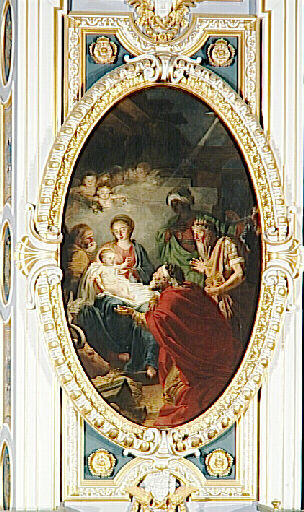
Adoration of the Magi, painting from 1781 at the Palace of Fontainebleau

Jean Bardin (1732–1809) was a French historical painter.

== Life ==
Bardin was born at Montbard in 1732. He was a pupil of Louis-Jean-François Lagrenée and later studied at Rome. He became a popular artist in France, and was admitted into the Academy in 1779. He was made director of the art school at Orléans in 1788. His subjects are partly historical, partly poetical, and sometimes religious. Bardin was the instructor, in the elements of art, of David and Regnault. He died at Orléans in 1809. His daughter, and pupil, was the painter Ambroise-Marguerite Bardin.

== Works ==
- Tullia Drives over the Corpse of her Father
