= Tullia Drives over the Corpse of her Father =

1765 painting by Jean Bardin

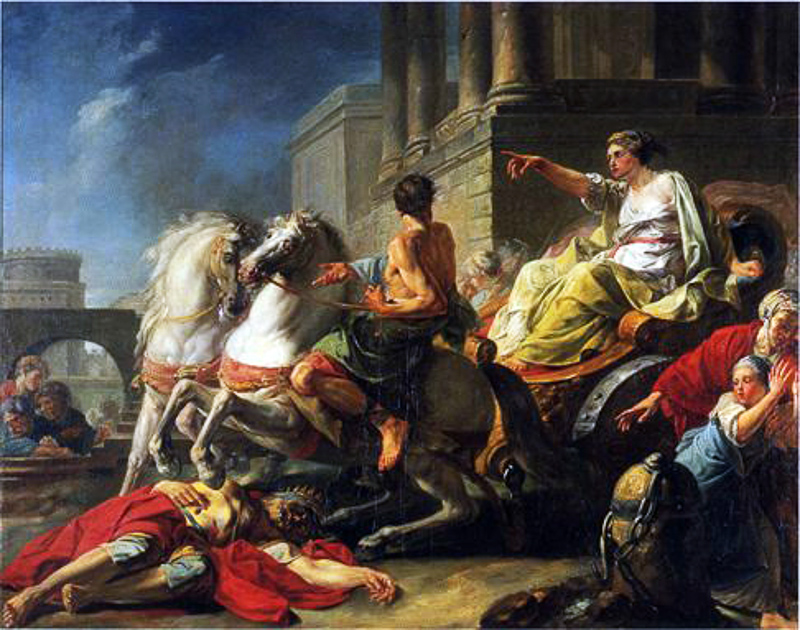
- Artist: Jean Bardin
- Year: 1765

Tullia Drives over the Corpse of her Father is a 1765 painting by French historical painter Jean Bardin which depicts Tullia, the last Queen of Rome and daughter of King Servius Tullius, as she orders her chairioter to drive over her fathers dead body. Bardin won first prize at the Prix de Rome for the work.

== See also ==
- Tullia driving her Chariot over her Father, by Giuseppe Bartolomeo Chiari
- Tullia Running Her Chariot over the Body of Her Father, by Michel-François Dandré-Bardon
- Tullia Driving her Chariot over the Body of her Father by François-Guillaume Ménageot
