= Tullia Minor =

Semi-legendary last queen of Rome

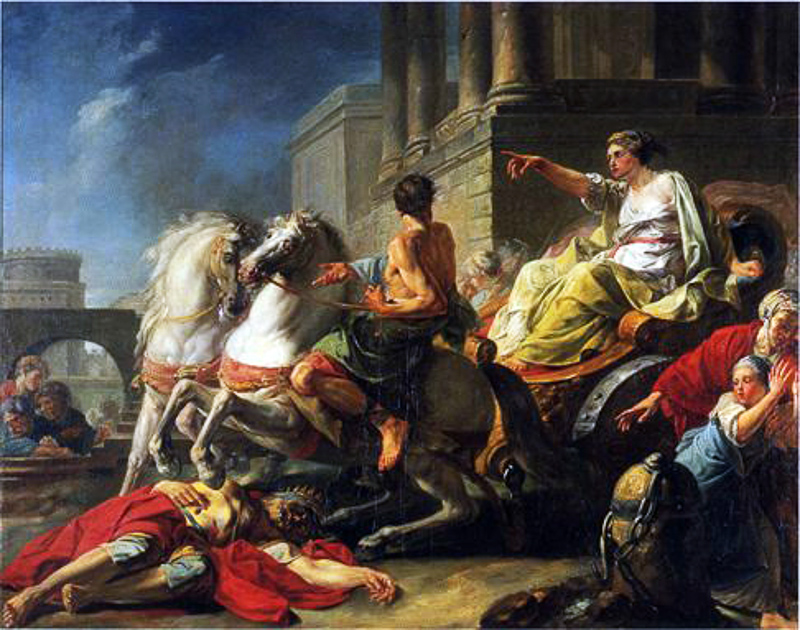
- Tullia Drives over the Corpse of her Father by Jean Bardin, ca.1765

Queen consort of Rome
- Tenure: c. 535 BC – 509 BC
- Spouse: Lucius Tarquinius Superbus
- Father: Servius Tullius
- Mother: Tarquinia

Tullia Minor is a semi-legendary figure in Roman history who can be found in the writings of Livy, Cicero, and Dionysius of Halicarnassus. She was the last queen of the Roman Kingdom.

Tullia Minor was the younger daughter of Rome's sixth king, Servius Tullius, who eventually married Lucius Tarquinius. Along with her husband, she arranged the overthrow and murder of her father, securing the throne for her husband. Her actions made her an infamous figure in ancient Roman culture.

== Family and marriages ==
Tullia was the younger of the two daughters of Rome's sixth king, Servius Tullius. By Roman custom, both daughters were named Tullia, the feminine form of their father's nomen, and were distinguished by the names Tullia Major ("senior Tullian daughter") and Tullia Minor ("junior Tullian daughter").

Servius Tullius arranged the marriage of his daughters to the two sons of his predecessor, Lucius Tarquinius Priscus. The sons were named Lucius and Arruns. According to Livy, the younger of the two daughters had the fiercer disposition, yet she was married to Arruns, who had the milder disposition of the two sons. Livy says that the similar temperaments of the younger Tullia and Lucius Tarquinius drew them to each other, and Tullia inspired her brother-in-law Tarquinius to greater daring. Together they arranged the murder of their respective siblings in quick succession, and Tarquinius and Tullia were afterwards married.

== Overthrow and murder of Servius Tullius ==
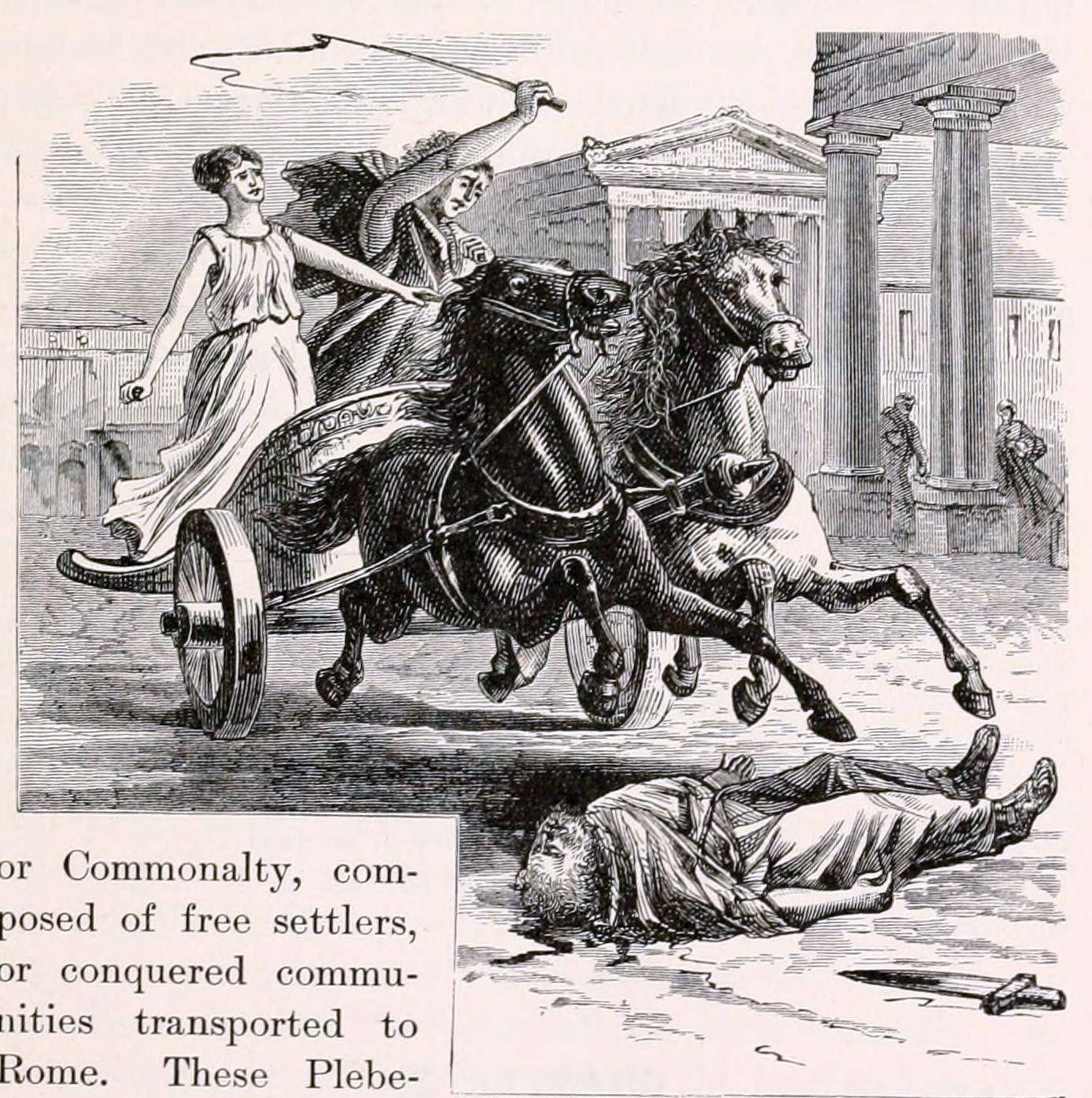
Tullia driving over her father's body

Tullia then encouraged her new husband to seek the throne. Tarquinius was convinced and began to solicit the support of the patrician senators, especially those families who had been given senatorial rank by his father. He bestowed presents on them and vilified Servius Tullius in their company.

Having acquired the backing of a large number of senators, Tarquinius went to the senate house with an armed guard and seated himself on the throne. When Servius Tullius protested, Tarquinius hurled him bodily into the street, where he was murdered by Tarquinius' assassins, apparently at Tullia's suggestion. Tullia then drove in her carriage to the senate house, where she hailed her husband as king. He ordered her to return home, away from the tumult. She drove along the Cyprian Street and turned towards the Orbian Hill, in the direction of the Esquiline Hill. There at the top of the Cyprian Street she encountered her father's mutilated remains and, in a mad frenzy, drove the carriage over his body. Ever afterwards this street was called the "Vicus Sceleratus" (street of infamy, or of wickedness) in memory of her actions.

Tullia's desecration of her murdered father's corpse spattered her with blood and stained her clothes, in which manner she returned to her husband's house. Livy states that Tarquinius' household gods were angered by this crime, and determined that a reign begun so badly would also end badly.

== Unpopularity and exile ==
When the uprising led by Lucius Junius Brutus ended the Roman monarchy and King Tarquinius and his family were exiled from Rome, Tullia in particular was cursed by the Roman people as she fled her home, given her role in the murder of her own father.

== In culture ==
Tullia is the main character of the 1533 play Tullia. She has also been depicted in several paintings. Additionally, Tullia was depicted in a now lost drawing by prominent French painter François Pascal Simon Gérard. This painting, which most likely depicted Tullia and Lucius being driven out of Rome, is widely believed to have been a metaphor for Marie Antoinette, solidifying Tullia as a figure of great ambition and controversy within wider culture. Tullia Minor also had great cultural impact on Rome at the time. After driving over her father's remains with her carriage, the street on which the act was performed (originally called Orbian Street) was from then on referred to as Impious Street by the Romans (Vicus Sceleratus).

== See also ==
- Category:Cultural depictions of Tullia Minor
