= Enrico Coleman =

Italian painter (1846–1911)

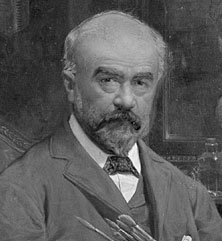
- Born: June 1846; Rome
- Died: 14 February 1911 (aged 64); Rome
- Known for: landscape, watercolour, orchids, Campagna Romana, Agro Pontino
- Movement: In arte libertas; XXV della Campagna Romana

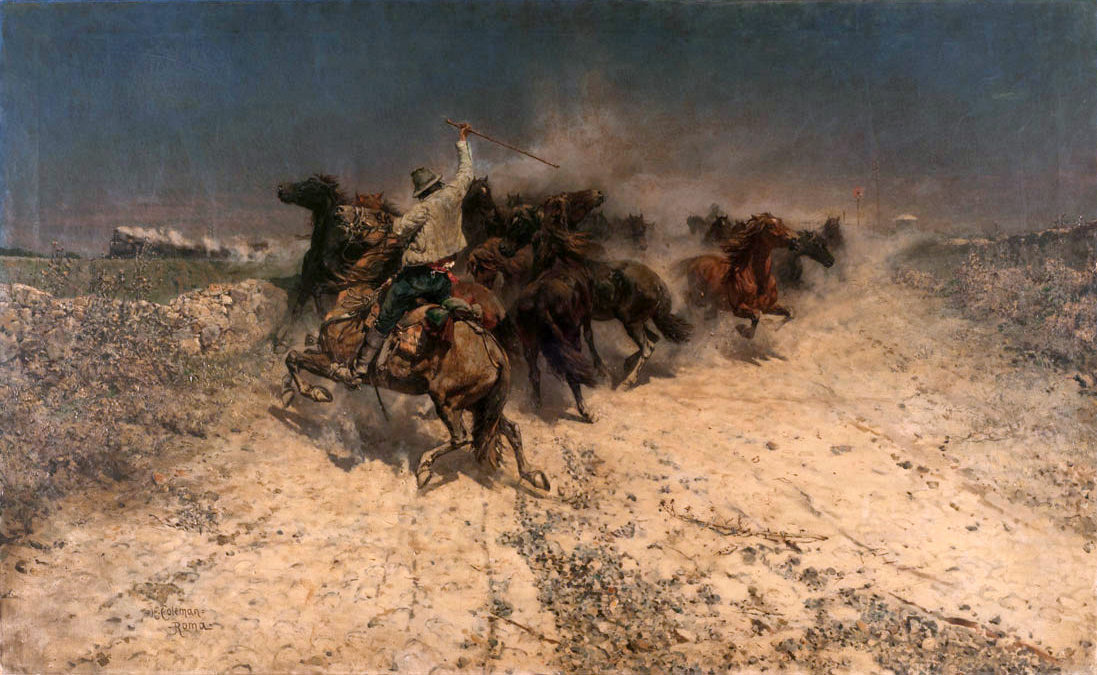
Timor panico, now in the Museo Nacional de Bellas Artes of Buenos Aires

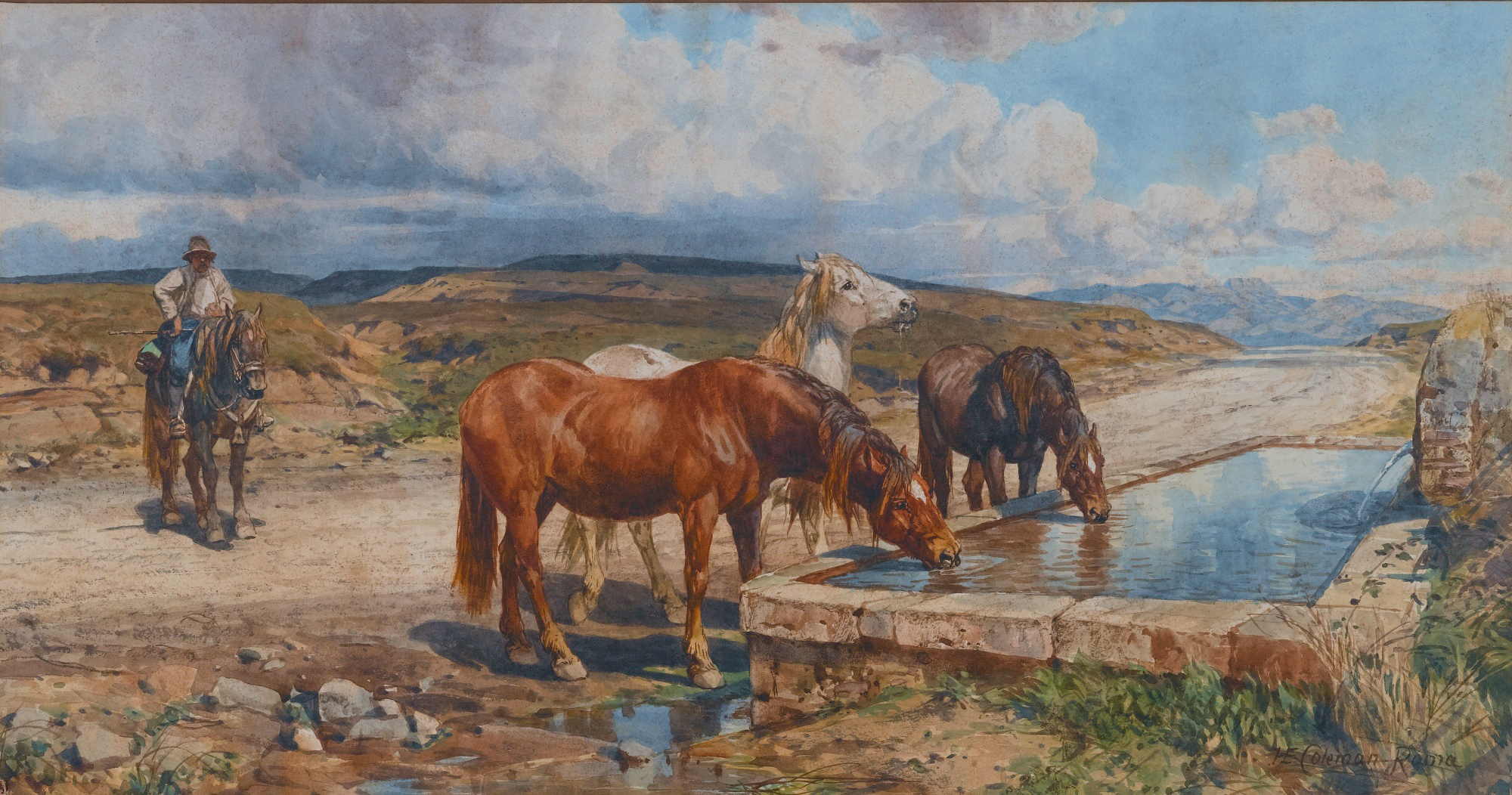
Horses drinking from a stone trough

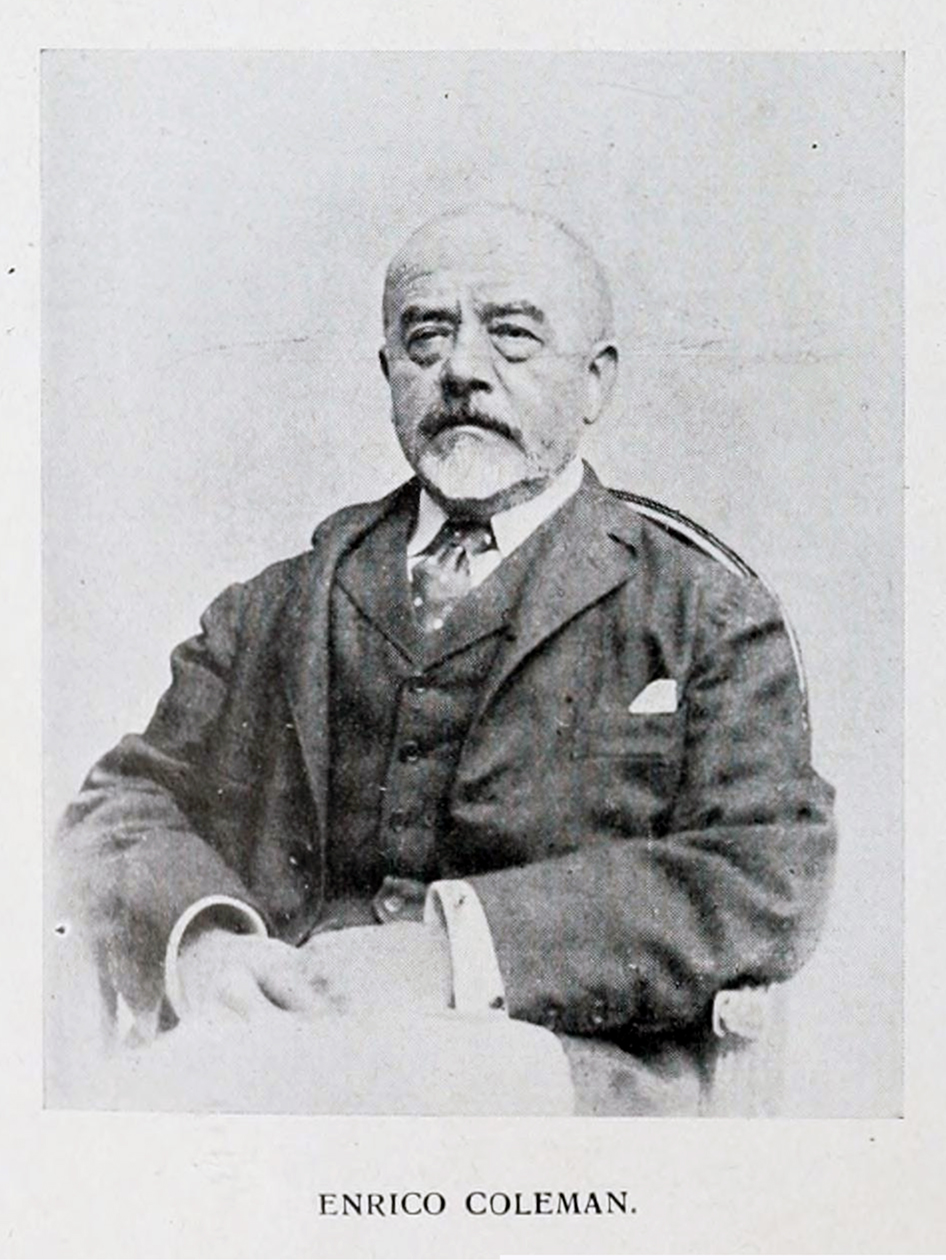
Portrait photograph of Coleman from "In Memoriam: Enrico Coleman", Emporium, 33 (196):306–313, April 1911

Enrico Coleman (21 or 25 June 1846 – 14 February 1911) was an Italian painter of British nationality. He was the son of the English painter Charles Coleman and brother of the less well-known Italian painter Francesco Coleman. He painted, in oils and in watercolours, the landscapes of the Campagna Romana and the Agro Pontino; he was a collector, grower and painter of orchids. Because of his supposedly Oriental air, he was known to his friends as "Il Birmano", the Burmese.

== Life ==
Enrico Coleman was born in Rome in June 1846. (Note: I Pittori Coleman has 25 June. See LCCN.) He was the fourth child of the English painter Charles Coleman, who had come to Rome in 1831 and settled there permanently in 1835, and of a famous artist's model from Subiaco, Fortunata Segadori (or Segatori), whom he had married in 1836.

Coleman was initially taught by his father, and either did or did not study at the Accademia di San Luca in Rome. Following the mocking reception of Una mandria di bufali nelle paludi pontine, a naturalistic painting of a herd of buffaloes in the Pontine marshes, at the International Artist's Club in 1872, he reportedly began to paint genre subjects in the manner of the then-fashionable Mariano Fortuny, although no works showing the influence of the Spanish painter are known. At the instigation of Nino Costa, he soon returned to the depiction of the people, animals and landscapes of the Campagna Romana and the Agro Pontino. (Note: According to Agresti, Costa said : "Dear Enrico, farewell! If you have any drawings by your father put away in your portfolios, unfold them religiously, frame them, kneel before them, and repent of ever having followed bad art") An album of watercolours from this youthful period (1871–1875) was recently rediscovered and was shown in Rome in 2004.

Coleman was lover of orchids, which he painted, collected and cultivated. A famous album of 88 orchid paintings, either in watercolour or in gouache, painted in the 1890s and entitled Orchidea Birmana was sold to an Englishman; it was "rediscovered" in the 1980s and published in facsimile. An 1894 watercolour of orchids is in the Galleria Comunale d'Arte Moderna e Contemporanea in Rome. Coleman had a remarkable collection of indigenous orchids, which he cultivated himself in special boxes at his house at 6 via Valenziana. He successfully hybridised Orchis provincialis var. pauciflora and Orchis mascula var. rosea; the botanist Fabrizio Cortesi named the hybrid Orchis x colemanii Cortesi in his honour.

In 1875, Coleman was among the founding members of the Società degli Acquarellisti, the Roman society of watercolourists; he participated in the society's first exhibition in 1876, and continued to exhibit with them until 1907. In 1878 he was elected an honorary member of the Société Royale Belge des Aquarellistes, the Belgian royal society of watercolourists, with which he participated in the Salon de Paris in 1879. From then on he began to exhibit regularly. He sent paintings to the 4th Esposizione Nazionale di Belle Arti, or national fine art show, of Turin in 1880, and to that of Milan in the following year; he showed works in London in 1882 and in Rome in 1883.

In 1885, Coleman was among the founding members of the group In Arte Libertas, of which Nino Costa was the leading force and the other founding members were Vincenzo Cabianca, Onorato Carlandi, Giuseppe Cellini, Alessandro Castelli, Cesare Formilli, Giuseppe Raggio, Alessandro Morani, Alfredo Ricci, Mario de Maria and Gaetano Vannicola. (Note: agresti) Coleman had six paintings in the first exhibition of the group, which took place from 10–28 February 1886, in the studio of an amateur painter named Giorgi, at 72 via S. Nicola da Tolentino. He participated in some measure in all of the subsequent annual exhibitions. From 1895 to 1899 the group exhibited collectively at the Esposizione Internazionale d'Arte della Città di Venezia, which would later become the Biennale di Venezia; Coleman continued to exhibit in every edition until the ninth in 1910.

Shortly after the death of Costa in 1903, In Arte Libertas was transformed into a new society, the "XXV della Campagna Romana". The XXV was born in the trattoria "Il Pozzo di San Patrizio" on the via Nomentana, on the evening of 24 May 1904. Coleman was elected "capocetta", "little head" or president, for life. The other members included Giuseppe and Ettore Ferrari, Onorato Carlandi, Giulio Aristide Sartorio, members of the earlier group, who were joined by Cesare Pascarella, Arturo Noci, Lorenzo Cecconi, Vittorio Grassi, Carlo Montani, Amedeo and Virgilio Simonetti, and others.

Enrico Coleman never married. Although he kept his British nationality throughout his life, he never visited Britain. The only large city he ever saw was Turin. According to Diego Angeli, apart from that one journey, he never went further north than Monte Soratte, nor further south than Terracina. As well as painting and orchids, he loved shooting and mountain-climbing. He was among the early members of the Club Alpino Italiano, which he joined in 1881, and of which he was made an honorary member for life in 1906. The club published his panorama of the Gran Sasso d'Italia in 1884, and awarded him a gold medal at the Esposizione Alpina, or mountaineering exhibition, in Bologna in 1888.

He died in Rome of pleurisy in the night of either 14 February 1911 or 4 February 1911, and is buried in the non-Catholic cemetery of Testaccio; the date on his gravestone is calculated from the foundation of Rome. Later the same year, he was the only artist to have a whole room dedicated to him at the Esposizione internazionale d'arte in Rome, in which forty-nine of his works, both oils and watercolours, were hung by a group of his friends. In the exhibitions of Castel Sant'Angelo for the 50th anniversary of the unification of Italy, his watercolours of mountain landscapes formed part of the exhibit of the Club Alpino Italiano. On the anniversary of Coleman's death, thirty of his works from the collection of his sister Giorgina were shown at the Studio Jandolo at 52a, via Margutta, on the initiative of Onorato Carlandi, Diego Angeli, Arturo Lancellotti and Jandolo himself.

== Published works ==
- 'Panorama invernale del Gran Sasso d'Italia' (chromolithograph); in Bollettino del Club Alpino Italiano, Torino: Fratelli Doyen, 1884. XVII: 50, tavola VII
- Gabriele d'Annunzio, Isaotta Guttadàuro ed altre poesie: con disegni di Vincenzo Cabianca, Onorato Carlandi, Giuseppe Cellini, Enrico Coleman, Mario de Maria, Cesare Formilli, Alessandro Morani, Alfredo Ricci, G.A. Sartorio. Roma: La Tribuna, 1886
- Edoardo de Fonseca, I castelli romani, Firenze: Fratelli Alinari, 1904
