= Arthur Murch (illustrator) =

English painter

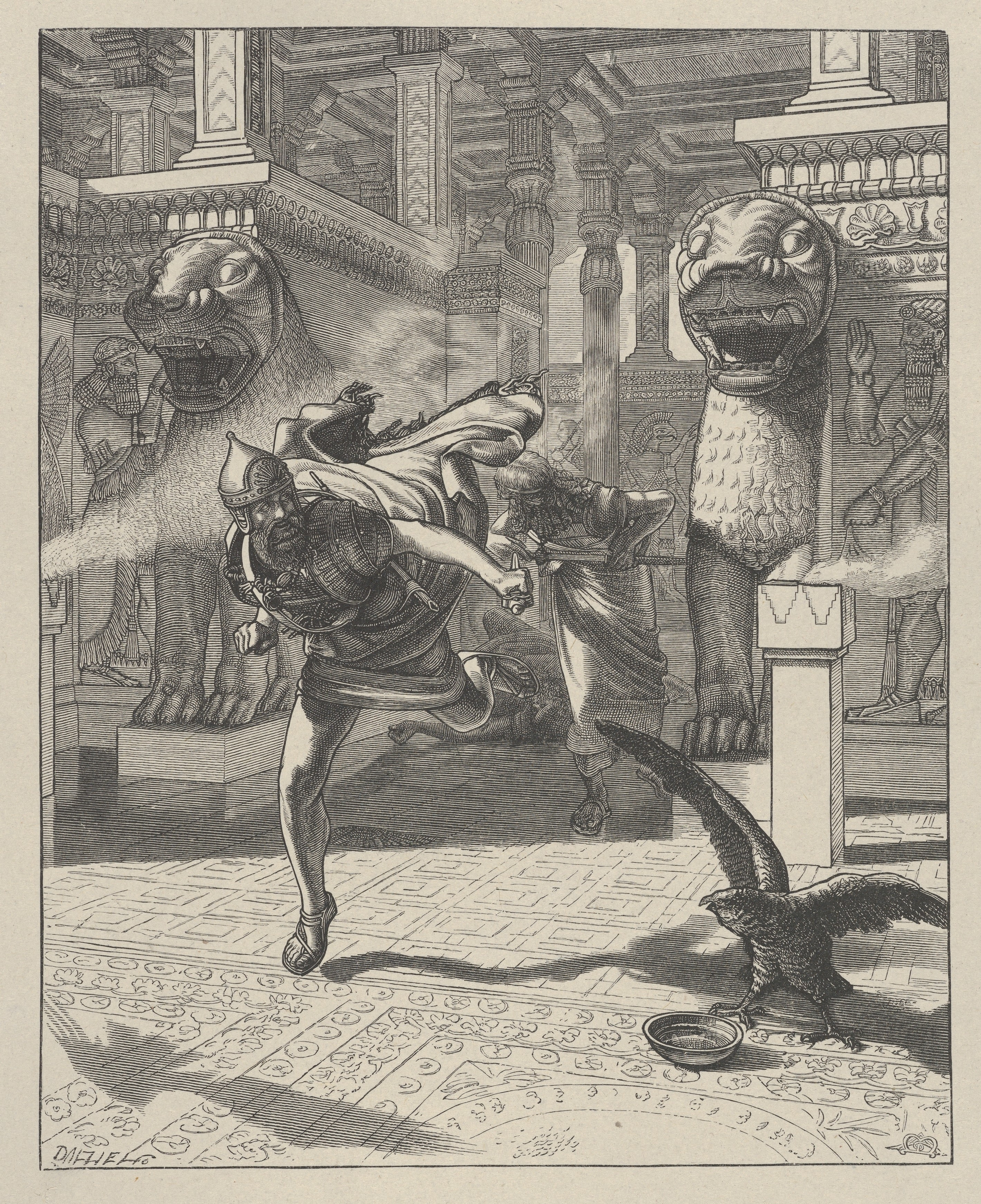
- The Flight of Adrammelech
- Born: 1836; Bath, England
- Died: 2 December 1885 (aged 48–49); Aachen
- Occupation: Illustrator

Arthur Murch (c. 1836 – 2 December 1885) was a British painter and illustrator.

== Life ==
He was the younger son of Jerom Murch (1807–1895), Unitarian minister at Bath, Somerset, and his wife Anne Meadows Taylor (1800–1893).

Murch was a pupil of Charles Gleyre, in 1859. Meeting Val Prinsep and Frederic Leighton in Rome, where he was painting, he was persuaded by Leighton to study drawing in Paris. He became a Captain in the Somersetshire Rifle Volunteers in 1864. He was sharing a studio in Great Russell Street, London in the later 1860s, with Frederick Jameson (1839–1916), but suffering from health problems. He was in Italy, 1871 to 1873, being in Capri in 1872. During the early 1880s he lived in Rome, with his wife.

Murch belonged to The Arts Club from 1865 to 1877. He died on 2 December 1885, at Aachen.

== Works ==
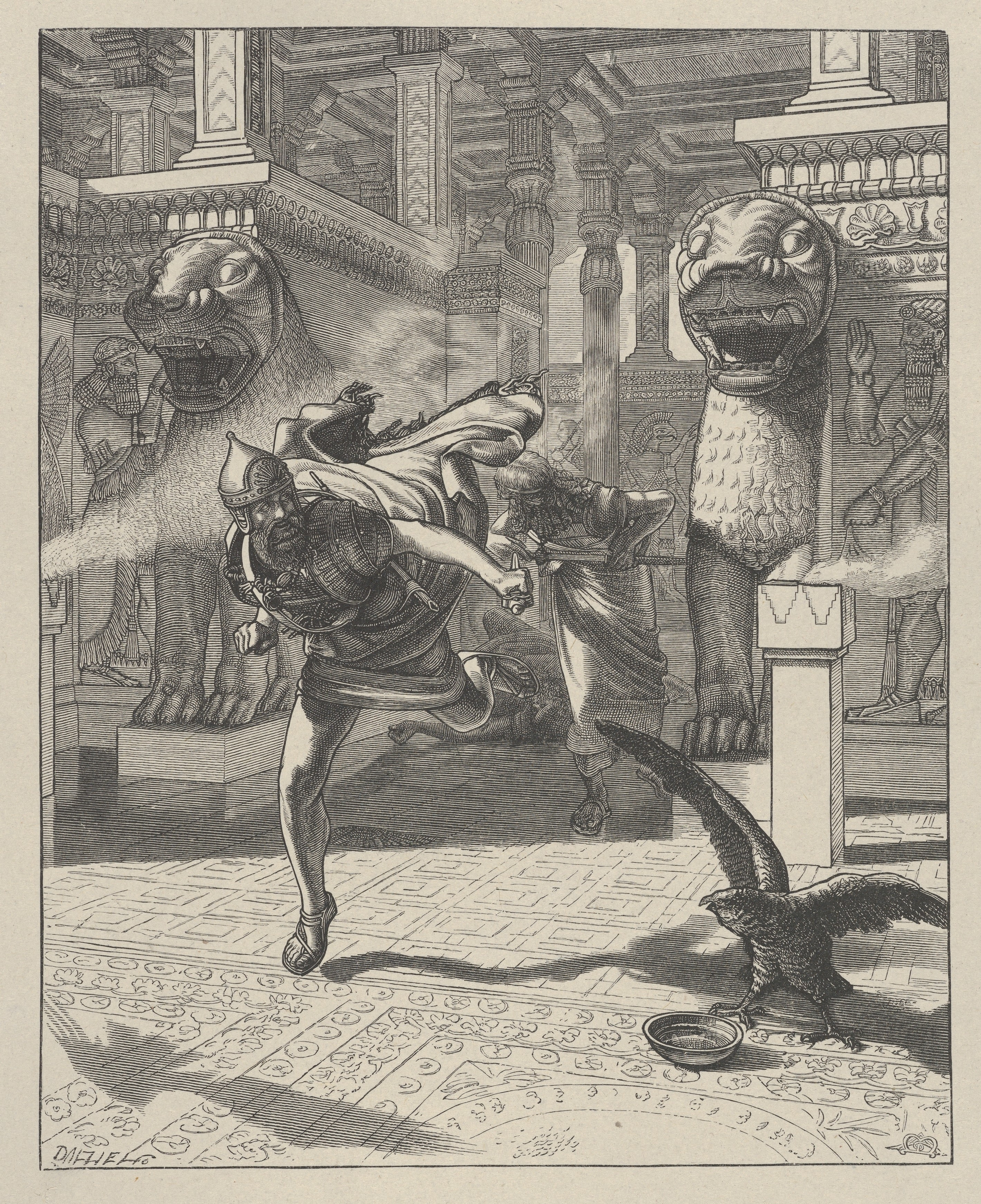
The Flight of Adrammelech, biblical illustration by Arthur Murch, and based on a watercolour by Frederick Charles Cooper of Assyrian artefacts in the British Museum

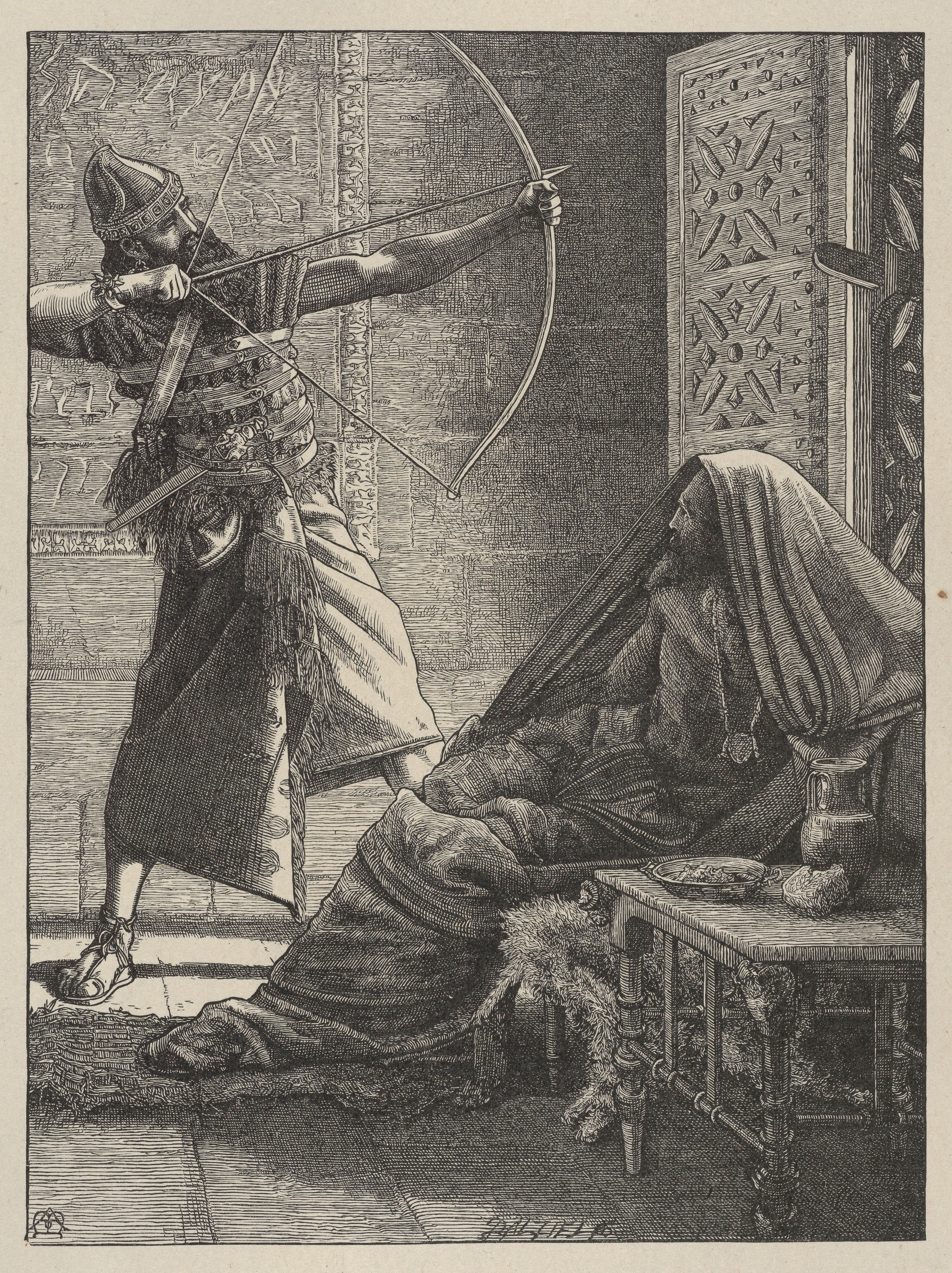
The Arrow of Deliverance, illustration by Arthur Murch in the Dalziels' Bible

Murch worked on Dalziels' Bible Gallery, published by the Dalziel Brothers. Walter Crane, who knew Murch, noted that he was "meticulous", and finished little. His reputation was based on the two illustrations he produced for the Bible Gallery.

== Family ==
Arthur Murch married Edith Edenborough, who after his death remarried on 17 March 1891 to Matthew Ridley Corbet. Edith was one of the Scuola Etrusca, around Giovanni Costa.

Arthur and Edith had a son, Denis Jerom Murch, born at Venice in 1874. Later in the Royal Artillery, he was left property in Sir Jerom Murch's will. He died in the Second Boer War, at Sanna's Post.
