= Charles Coleman (English painter) =

British painter

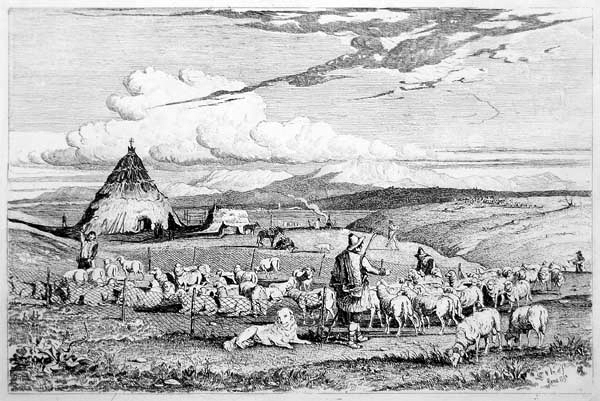
- Charles Coleman, etching of transhumant shepherds in the Campagna Romana, showing sheep, a working dog of Pastore Maremmano-Abruzzese type, horses of Maremmano type and a conical capanna or lestra; from A Series of Subjects peculiar to the Campagna of Rome and Pontine Marshes (1850)
- Born: Charles Coleman c. 1807; Pontefract, Yorkshire
- Died: 1874; Rome
- Known for: Campagna Romana; Agro Pontino
- Movement: Campagna Romana School
- Spouse: Fortunata Segadori

Charles Coleman (c. 1807 – 1874) was a British landscape and animal painter, born in Pontefract, in Yorkshire, England. He was active principally in Rome, where was an important influence on Nino Costa and made a significant contribution to the formation of the Campagna Romana School of painting.

== Life ==
Coleman first went to Rome in 1831 to study the paintings of Michelangelo and Raphael. He became permanently resident there in 1835, and on 21 June 1836 married Fortunata Segadori (or Segatori) from Subiaco, who, along with Vittoria Caldoni of Albano, was one of the most famous Roman models of the time. Segadori had sat for August Riedel; a portrait of her by Johann Heinrich Richter is in the Thorvaldsen Museum in Copenhagen. The couple had eight children; their son Enrico Coleman (1846–1911), was also a landscape painter, in oils and watercolour, as was the younger and less well-known Francesco Coleman. The Colemans' first address was 25 via Zucchelli. In 1869 the family moved to 16 via Zucchelli, and for the first time Coleman set up a separate studio, at 33 via Margutta, possibly with the intention of providing space for his two painter sons.

== Works ==
Four of his paintings, dated from 1845 to 1847 and all featuring buffaloes, are listed in the catalogue of the collection of Beriah Botfield. From 1848 to 1850 he made etchings of scenes and animals in the Campagna Romana, and these were published in 1850 as A Series of Subjects peculiar to the Campagna of Rome and Pontine Marshes, designed from nature and etched by C. Coleman. He was dismissive of academic teaching, believing that observation from nature was the best education for an artist. He exhibited five times at the Royal Academy of London, for the last time in 1869.

Coleman remained largely unknown in his native country but became a major influence on the Italian landscape painter Nino Costa, whom he met in the Campagna in the early 1850s. Coleman was considered the founder of the "Campagna Romana" school of painting in Italy.

He died in Rome in 1874.

== Published works ==
- A Series of Subjects peculiar to the Campagna of Rome and Pontine Marshes, designed from nature and etched by C. Coleman Rome: [s.n.] 1850.
