= Alfredo Ricci =

Italian painter (1864–1889)

- Born: 1864; Rome, Kingdom of Italy
- Died: 1889 (aged 25)
- Known for: Genre paintings

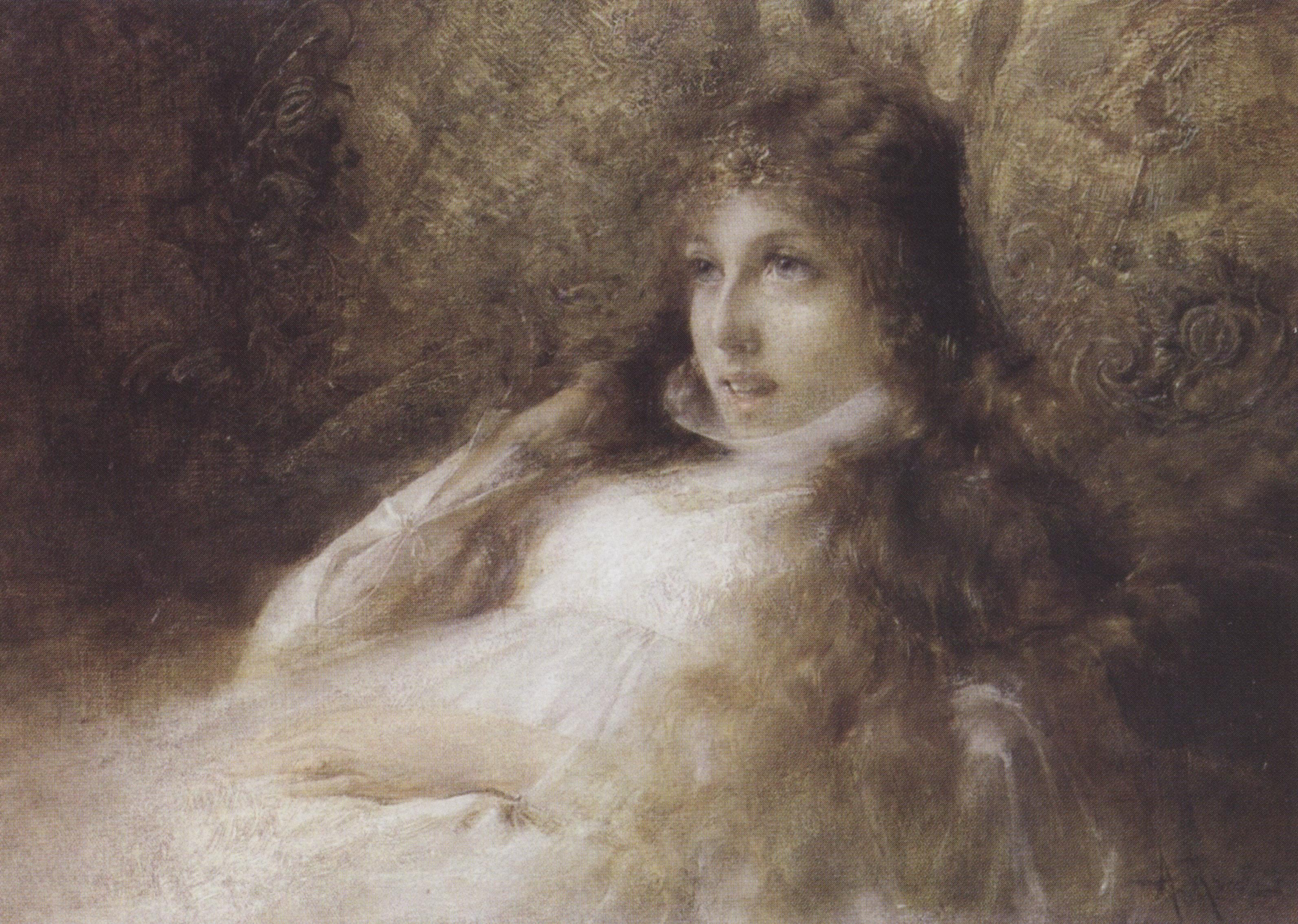
1886 illustration for Gabriele D'Annunzio's Isaotta Guttadauro

Alfredo Ricci (1864, Rome–1889) was an Italian painter, mainly painting genre pieces in watercolor.

== Biography ==
Ricci studied at, but did not graduate from, the Accademia di San Luca. Along with artists including Gabriele D'Annunzio, Scipione Vannutelli, Onorato Carlandi, Mario de Maria, Enrico Coleman and Giulio Aristide Sartorio, he frequented the Caffè Greco in Rome. He was influenced by the Pre-Raphaelites and helped found the group In Arte Libertas in 1886.

In 1884, he exhibited Desideri in Turin; the following year, he exhibited Ozio in Rome. Among other works are: Dolce far niente; Costume romano; Ciociara, and Buttero del Lazio. His painting of an organist, titled Mystical music (1866), is in the Galleria Nazionale d'Arte Moderna in Rome along with many of his other pieces.
