= Master of the Egmont Albums =

Flemish drawer

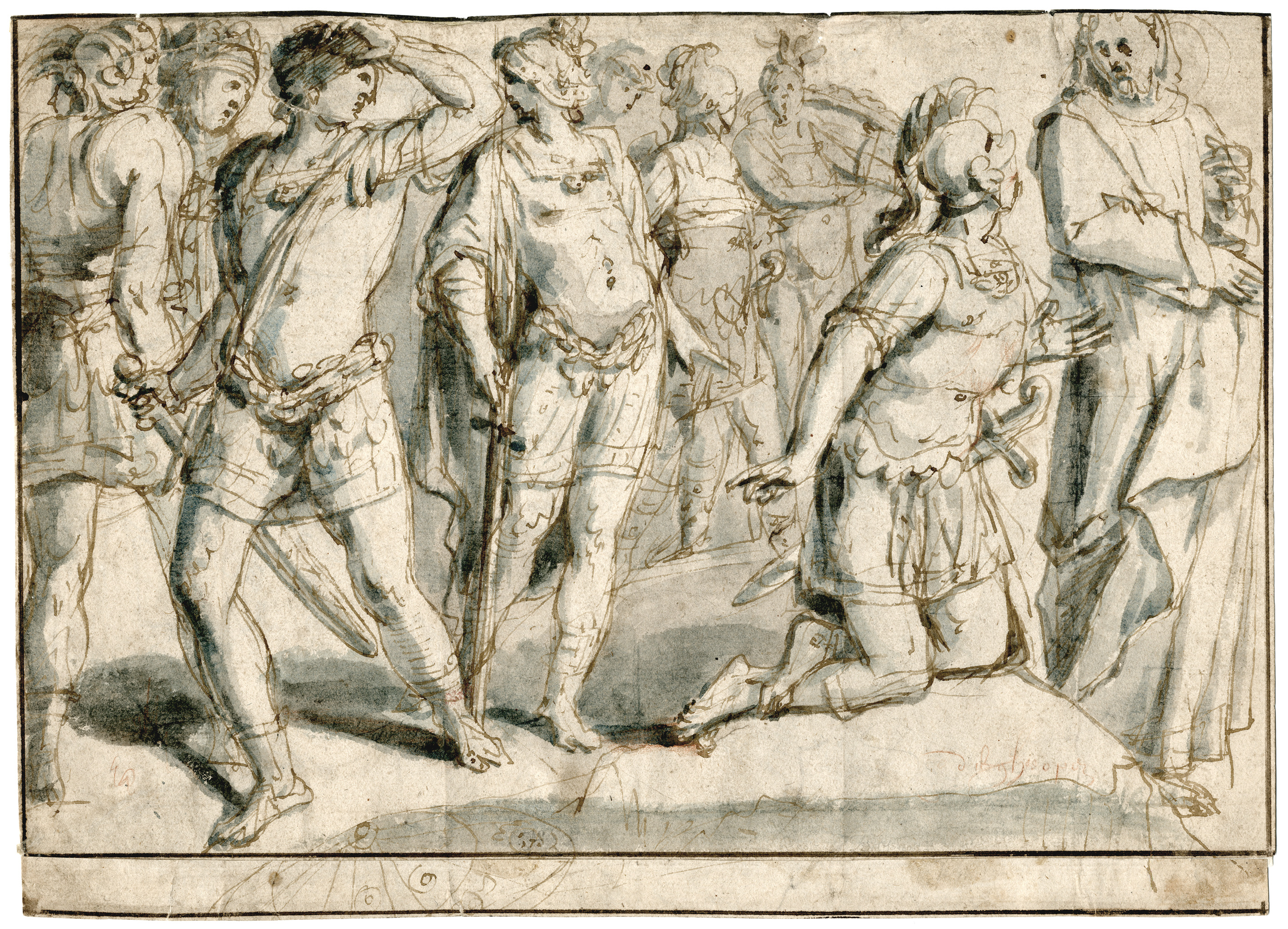
Christ and the centurion, Prentenkabinet University of Leiden

The Master of the Egmont Albums (fl. 1575–1620) is the notname given to an unknown draughtsman of the Renaissance active at the end of the 16th century and early 17th century. Today, between 30 and 50 drawings in total are attributed to the master by comparison of styles. Some of these attributions are disputed by scholars. The themes of the drawings range from biblical scenes, mostly from the life of Jesus, mythological stories and battle scenes.

== Identification ==
The notname was given as five or six anonymous drawings attributed to the master were collected in six albums of drawings that were formerly in the collection of John Perceval, 1st Earl of Egmont who had acquired them at the beginning of the 18th century. Since 1957 the albums are in the possession of the Yale University Art Gallery in New Haven in the United States.

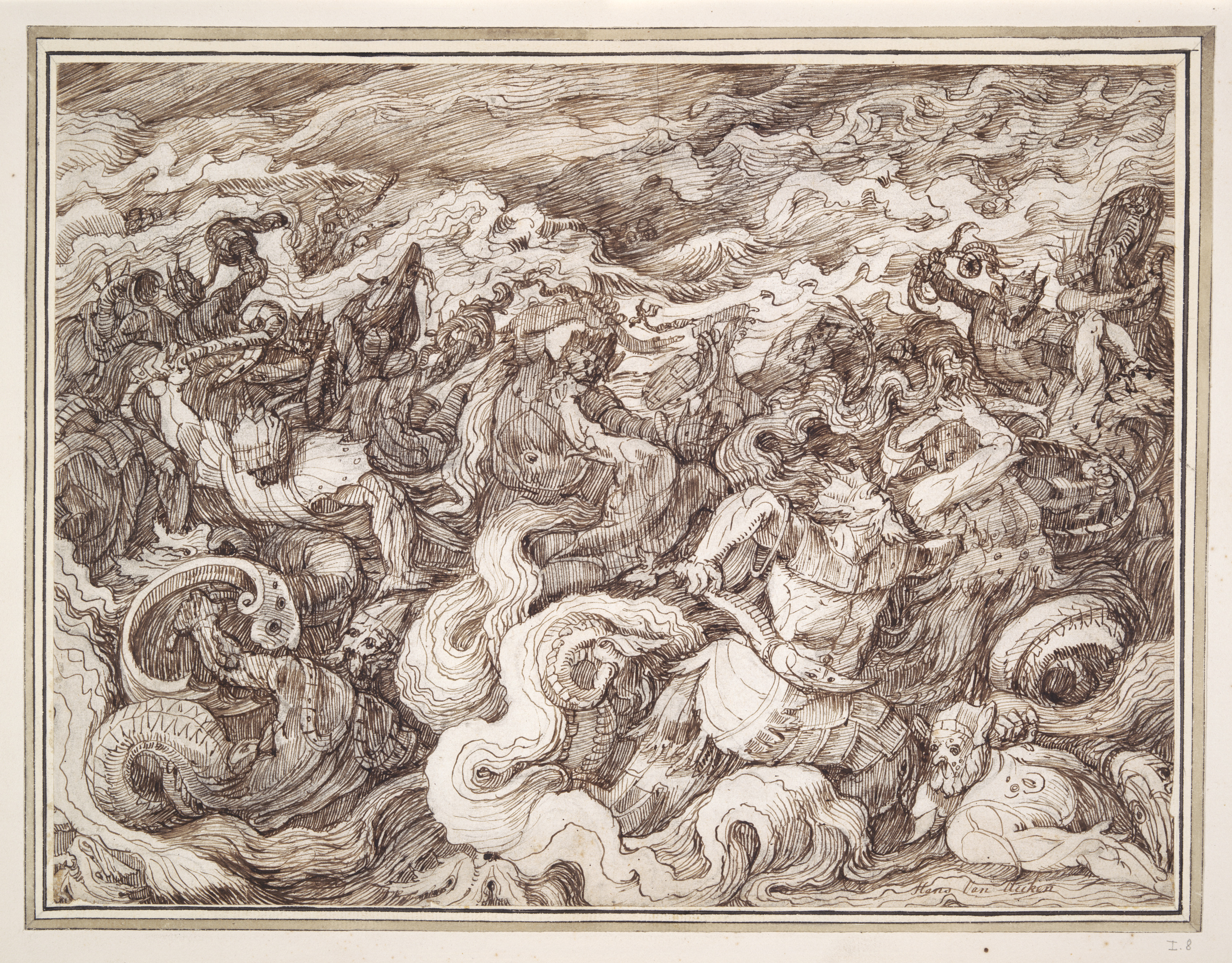
Battle of the Tritons, Yale University Art Gallery

The master's links with the Habsburg Netherlands are attested by the Dutch-language inscriptions on two drawings: a sheet kept at Loppem Castle in Belgium and a drawing in the Prentenkabinet of Leiden University in the Netherlands. The works show Italian and Nordic influences. This seems to indicate an initial training in the Southern Netherlands and a trip to southern Europe, as the works show knowledge of Venetian and Roman art as well as the works of Albrecht Dürer. The artist may also have had links with Cologne as the paper on which one of the drawings is produced bears a watermark that was in use in Cologne at the time. In a print of c. 1600 engraved by Crispijn van de Passe, who was active in Cologne, after a drawing attributed to the master, the (abbreviated) name of the inventor is 'Quiten d M'. This may be a reference to the Flemish Renaissance painter Quentin Metsys the Younger who was active in Germany. It has, however, not been possible to conclusively identify the artist behind this monogram. It is likely that the Master of the Egmont Albums was active in Italy in the late 16th century but had a career situated mostly in Northern Europe.

In 1990 Nicole Dacos tentatively identified the artist with the Amsterdam-based artist Dirck Hendricksz Centen (better known as Teodoro d'Errico), who was active in Naples from 1574. This hypothesis was definitively rejected after the discovery of an autograph drawing by Dirck Hendricksz Centen (auctioned at Sotheby's in London on 15 July 2012 as lot number 14), because that drawing was stylistically very different from the drawing styles of the drawings attributed to the master. On the basis of stylistic comparison, Anthonie Blocklandt van Montfoort, Claudius Cock, Frans Francken the Elder, Jacob de Gheyn I, Hendrick Goltzius, Hans von Aachen, Giovanni Antonio da Pordenone, Giulio Romano, Giovanni della Rovere, Domenico Puligo, Tintoretto a Northern follower of Francesco Salviati and Giovanni Battista Naldini and even Rubens have previously been proposed as possible creators of some of the drawings attributed to the Master. The broad range of attributions reflects the eclectic style of the artist.

== Work ==
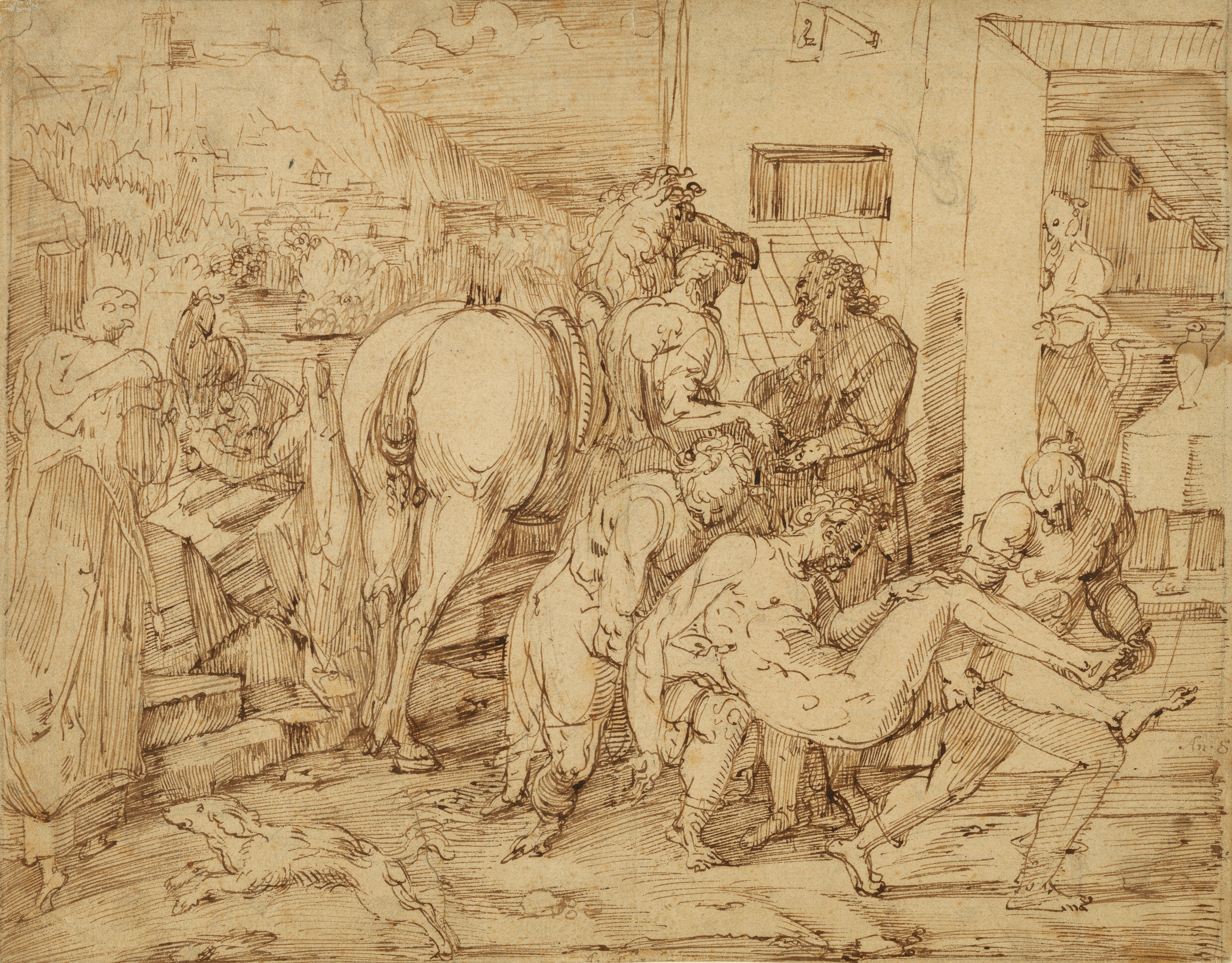
The Good Samaritan

Between 30 and 50 drawings are attributed to the master. Art historians including Philip Pouncey started from the 5 or 6 drawings given to the artist in the Egmont albums to attribute additional works. Initially only pen-and-ink drawings were included in the corpus of the master. In 1964, three black-chalk drawings were added to the oeuvre. The latter attributions are not uncontested. Further attributions of works in the Louvre, Paris, and the Kupferstich-Kabinett of the Staatliche Kunstsammlungen Dresden raised the number of attributions to about 50 drawings in various media.

The subjects of the drawings include Bible stories, mythological subjects and battle scenes.

The master's artistic style is close to the Mannerism prevalent in central Italy at the time. The drawings are also reminiscent of the works of the Flemish artist Bartholomew Spranger, the most famous of the Northern Mannerists who worked at the imperial court in Prague. The master's graphic stroke is very light in the details. The use of the pen is very varied and spontaneous. The complex compositions are worked out in black chalk over which strong pen lines are drawn often in two different shades of brown ink and juxtapose dark hatched shadows next to areas of white paper.
