= Johann Richter =

Johann Richter can refer to:

- Johann Richter (footballer)
- Johann Heinrich Richter
- Johannes Praetorius (mathematician)
- Jean Paul, German Romantic writer, born Johann Paul Friedrich Richter
