= Francesco Coleman =

Italian artist (1851–1918)

- Born: Francesco Coleman; 23 July 1851; Rome
- Died: 9 January 1918 (aged 66)
- Known for: landscape, water-colour, Campagna Romana, Orientalism

Francesco Coleman (1851–1918) was an Italian painter. He was the son of the English painter Charles Coleman and brother of the better-known Italian painter Enrico Coleman. He was known as a painter, in oil and in water-colour, of the people and landscapes of the Campagna Romana and the Agro Pontino, and of oriental subjects.

== Life ==
Francesco Coleman was born in Rome on 23 July 1851. He was the sixth of eight children of the English painter Charles Coleman, who had come to Rome in 1831 and settled there permanently in 1835, and his wife Fortunata Segadori, a famous artist's model from Subiaco, whom he had married in 1836. He studied painting in his father's studio, and showed a particular aptitude for water-colours. He shared this studio at via Margutta 33 with his father and brother throughout his life. He ceased all artistic activity after the death of Enrico in 1911.

He died on 9 January 1918 at his home in via Valenziani, near the Porta Salaria. He was buried in the Cimitero del Verano.
