= Luigi Durantini =

Italian painter

Luigi Durantini (1791 – 1857) was an Italian painter active in his native Rome, active in a Neoclassical style.

== Biography ==
He trained and later became a professor at the Academy of St Luke in Rome. He was made Knight of the Order of San Silvestro by the Papal authorities. His father Filippo Durantini was a scholar. One of his pupils was Giovanni Costa.
