= Giuseppe Ferrari (painter) =

Italian painter (1840–1905)

- Born: 21 December 1840; Rome, Papal States
- Died: 4 August 1905 (aged 64); Rieti
- Education: Accademia di San Luca
- Occupation: Painter

Giuseppe Ferrari (1840–1905) was an Italian painter.

== Biography ==
After completing his academic studies at Accademia di San Luca in Rome under the tutelage of Alessandro Marini, he travelled through Africa and the Middle East, where he found strong suggestions and inspiration for several landscape paintings from that period. In 1877 he moved to London, where he studied the work of painters such as John Constable and William Turner. Ferrari's pupils included Lillie Logan.

== Artistic production ==
Ferrari is considered one of the most important Italian landscape painters of his time. In particular, he used to portray the campagna romana, insomuch as founded with other painters, among which Enrico Coleman and Cesare Pascarella, the group "XXV della campagna romana". In the last years of his life he dedicated to portraits as well.

== Exhibits ==
In 1877 and in 1883 he exhibited at the Royal Academy of Arts in London. Ferrari participated at the first Venice Biennale in 1895, but also in those held in 1905 and 1922 (posthumous participation).

== Paintings in museums ==
- Rieti, civic museum;
- Rome, Galleria Nazionale d'Arte Moderna;
- Milan, Modern Art Gallery.

Ferrari, with Coleman, also realized the frescos for Villa Durante in Rome in 1891.

== Bibliography ==
- M. C. Cola, Giuseppe Ferrari, in Dizionario biografico degli Italiani Treccani, volume 46, 1996.
