= Edith Corbet =

Australian artist (1846–1920)

- Born: Edith Edenborough; 28 December 1846; Goulburn, Australia
- Died: 1920 (aged 73–74); Hampstead, United Kingdom
- Known for: Painting
- Spouse(s): Arthur Murch, Matthew Ridley Corbet

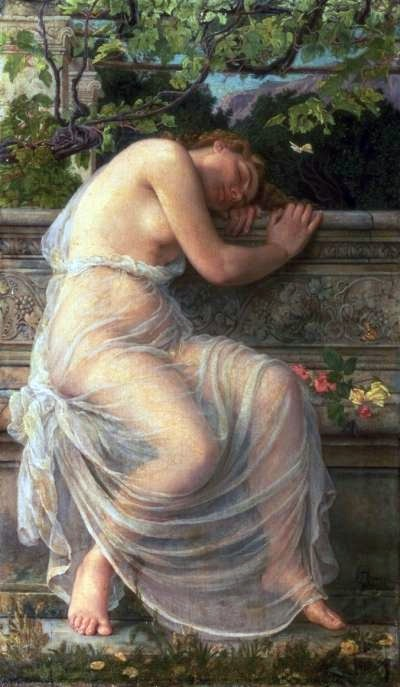
The Sleeping Girl, c. 1882

Edith Corbet née Edenborough (28 December 1846 – 1920) was a Victorian landscape painter, having close associations with the Macchiaioli group (also known as the Tuscans or Etruscans), who, in a break with tradition, painted outdoors in order to capture natural light effects and favoured a panoramic format for their paintings.

== Life ==
Edith Edenborough was born in Goulburn, New South Wales, Australia, the second daughter and fifth child of Henry Edenborough and Margaret Stedman. The Edenborough family came from Leicestershire, but relocated to London, where they became prosperous merchants in hosiery and silk. Henry Edenborough was a sea captain and made several voyages to Australia between 1833 and 1837, deciding to settle there in 1840. He acquired a farm south of Goulburn known as 'Wollogorang' and built "a handsome two-storey brick and stone rubble building notable for its interesting French windows and its impressive outbuildings". This was the family home until 1854 when Henry and Margaret sold the property to John William Chisholm, and returned to England with their family of six children. Henry died in 1855 at Chesham Lodge in Surrey, aged 43. In 1861 the British census records show Edith, 14 years old, living with her widowed mother in Kensington. The 1871 census shows her living with her sister Annie, noted as head of household, at 5 Sheffield Gardens in Kensington, in which year she was exhibiting her work in London.

She married the Victorian painter and illustrator Arthur Murch and moved to Rome, where she painted with Giovanni Costa, leader of the Macchiaioli group. In 1876 they both stayed in Venice. Olivia Rossetti Agresti wrote: "Costa had a very high opinion of this artist's gifts and used to remember with pleasure how on that occasion they used to go out together to paint from nature at Fusino" (Agresti, 1904).

She frequently exhibited from 1880 to 1890 at the Grosvenor Gallery and the New Gallery. In 1891, after the death of her first husband, she married Matthew Ridley Corbet, one of the Macchiaioli group's leading members, after which she exhibited mainly at the Royal Academy, visiting Italy and living in London for the remainder of her life. Corbet exhibited her work at the Palace of Fine Arts at the 1893 World's Columbian Exposition in Chicago, Illinois. She died in Hampstead, north London, in 1920.

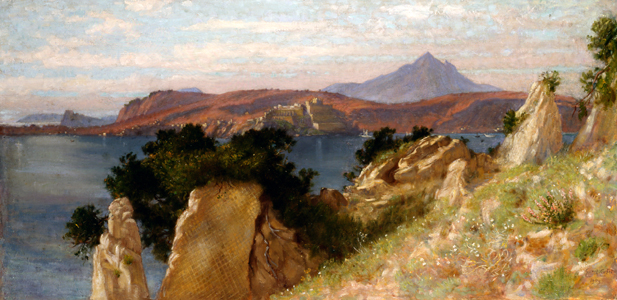
Cicero's Villa and the Bay of Baiae, 1909
