= Casa dei Tre Oci, Venice =

Neo-Gothic palace on the island of Giudecca, Venice, Italy

Coordinates: 45°25′36″N 12°20′18″E

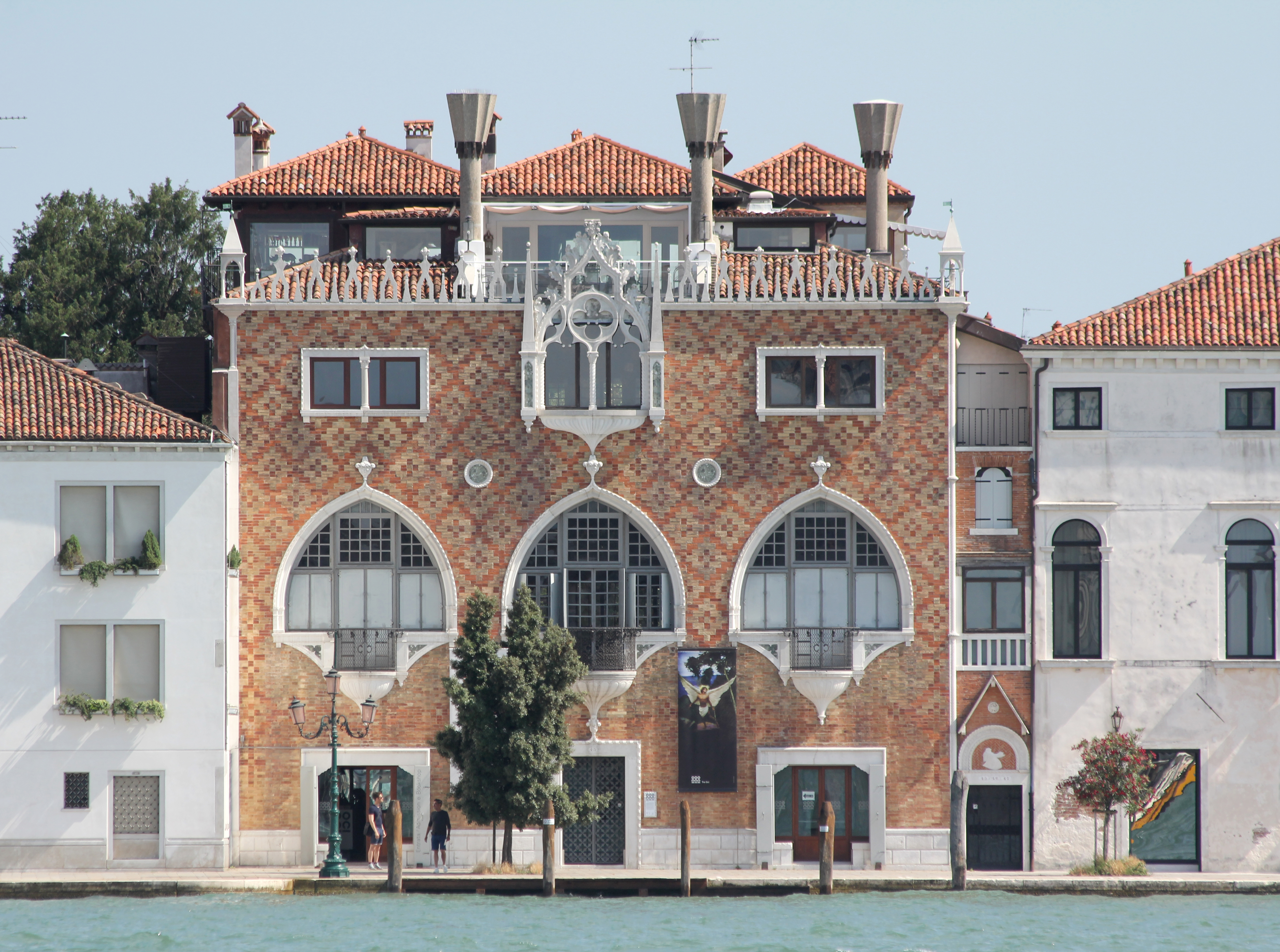
Casa dei Tre Oci

The Casa dei Tre Oci or Casa di Maria is a modern, neo-Gothic palace located on the island of Giudecca of the sestiere of Dorsoduro in Venice. The facade is visible across the Giudecca Canal from the Church of the Zitelle.

== History ==
La Casa dei Tre Oci was designed in 1912-1913 by the Bolognese painter Mario de Maria as his own house. It is stated that the symbolism of the facade is that the three large windows represent Maria's immediate family: his son, wife, and himself, while the smaller upper window represents his then-daughter Silvia, who had recently died in her youth. The Italian term for the eye (occhi) in the Venetian language is òci, hence the house's name.

After the Maria family, the palace was occupied for a spell by the architect Renzo Piano. In 2016, the house was owned by Polymnia Venezia Srl, a cultural institution promoting twentieth-century art. In the 1960s, Fulbright scholars Wolf Kahn, William T. Bradshaw, Richard Miller, and William Eddelman lived and worked in the building. During those years, it was known as the Casa de Maria. Many noted painters lived and worked there, including Friedensreich Hundertwasser and his wife, as well as Pegeen Vail Guggenheim. Miss Berheimer, who was an assistant to Max Reinhardt, also resided there. American painter Edward Melcarth was also listed as a brief resident in the early 1950s and was regarded with suspicion by the FBI, along with other U.S. citizens residing at the address, because they "dedicated themselves to the paintings that exemplify social and political themes." There were several separate apartments and art studios. At one time, the top floor was used by the American Consulate. The historic gondola, once in the lobby, is now in the Venice Arsenale Museum.

The Fondazione di Venezia acquired the building in 2000 and reopened it in 2012 post-refurbishment as a gallery for photography exhibitions. In 2021, Nicolas Berggruen signed a preliminary agreement to purchase the building, with plans to use the space to host symposia, workshops, and exhibitions in partnership with major museums.

== Gallery ==
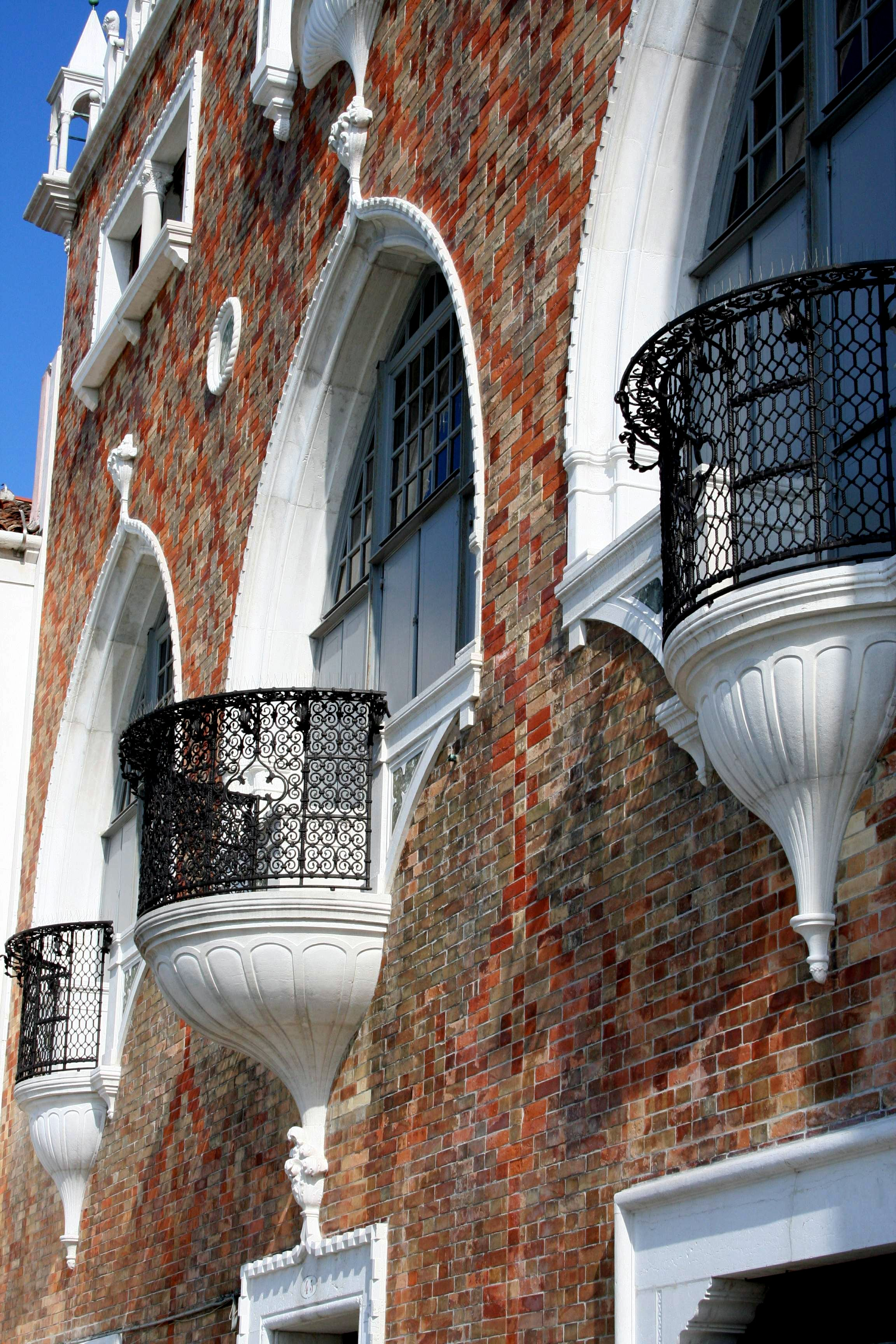
Facade

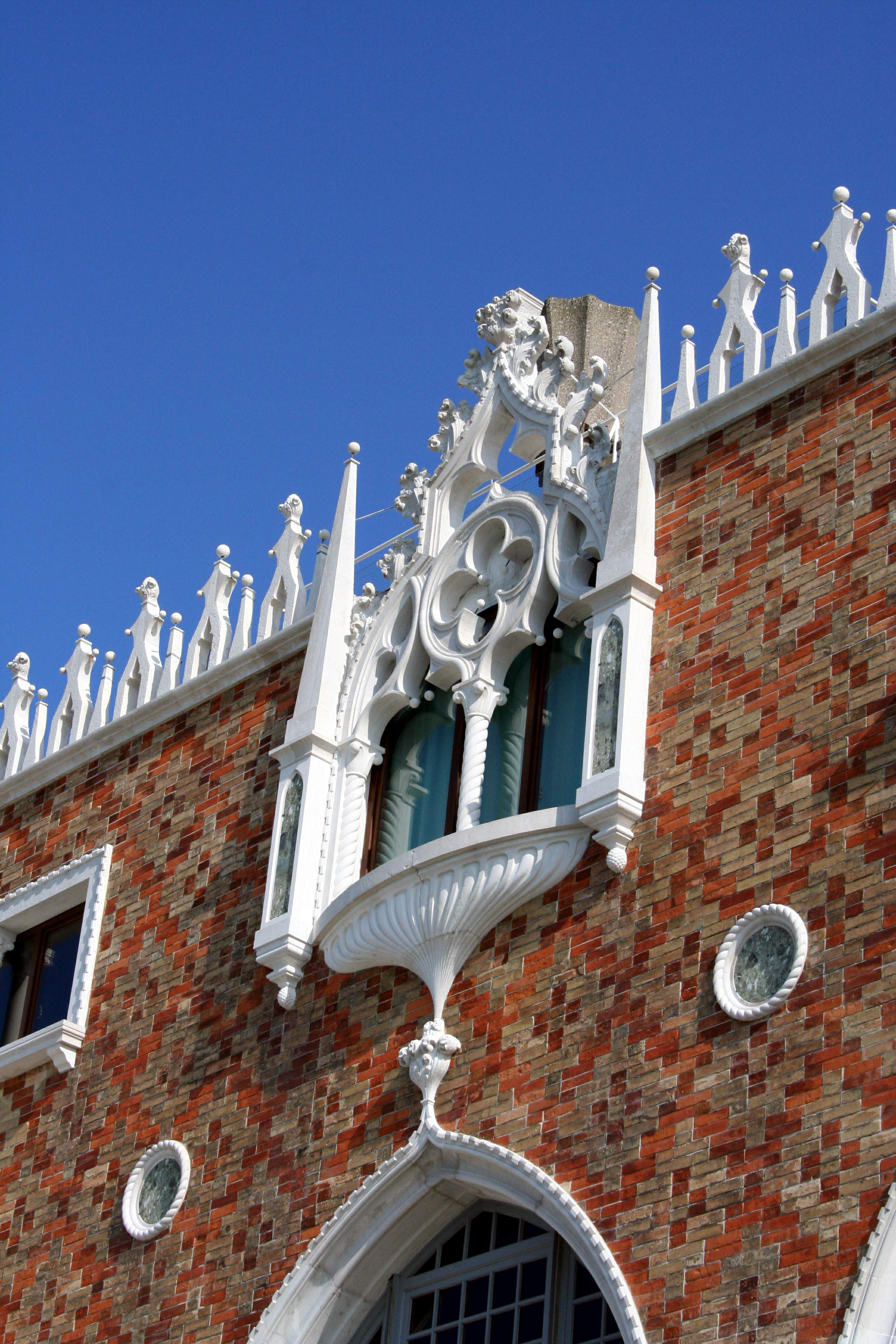
Second floor window

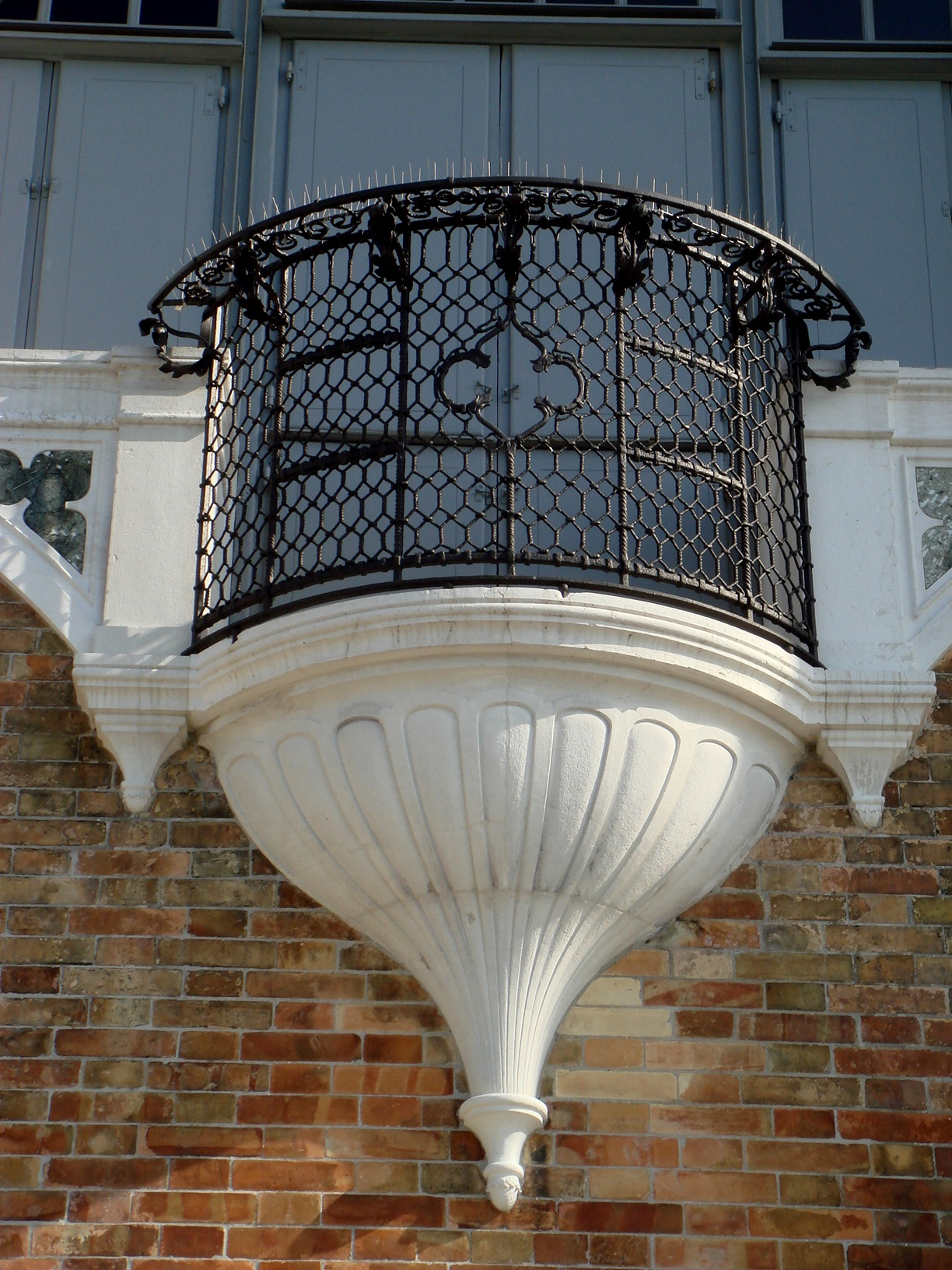
Detail of terraces

== Bibliography ==
- Guida d'Italia – Venezia. 3^{a} ed. Milano, Touring Editore, 2007. ISBN 978-88-365-4347-2.
- Derived from the Italian Wikipedia entry

== Visiting ==
The Casa dei Tre Oci is open Everyday from 10am - 7pm (closed on Tuesdays)

It is located on the island of Giudecca and is mostly easily reached by the Zitelle vaporetto stop.

TIckets cost €12 in person or €9 with the MyPass Venezia App.

The current on display is the Letizia Battaglia Exhibition until August 18, 2019.
