= John Gere =

English art historian (1921–1995)

John Gere FBA FSA
- Born: 7 October 1921
- Died: 11 January 1995 (aged 73)
- Title: Keeper of Prints and Drawings (1973–1981)

Academic background
- Education: Balliol College, Oxford; Courtauld Institute of Art

Academic work
- Discipline: Art history
- Sub-discipline: Pre-Raphaelites; Italian Renaissance painting; Mannerism
- Institutions: British Museum

John Arthur Giles Gere, FBA, FSA (7 October 1921 – 11 January 1995) was an English art historian and curator. An expert on 16th- and 17th-century Italian drawings, he was the Keeper of Prints and Drawings at the British Museum from 1973 to 1981.

== Early life and education ==
Gere was born on 7 October 1921 to Edward Arnold Gere, a patent examiner, and Catherina (née Giles), who moved in Vorticist circles; on his father's side, his half-uncle Charles March Gere and two aunts (Margaret Gere and Edith Payne, the wife of H. A. Payne) were artists of the Birmingham School. By the time he started school at Winchester College, he was already immersing himself in art, reading and culture. In 1939, he joined the British Army, but was forced to leave for health reasons and attended Balliol College, Oxford, from 1940 to 1943; he read English under John Bryson, achieved a third and received his BA in 1945.

== Career, research and honours ==
After a short spell of voluntary work at the Tate Gallery, Gere enrolled at the Courtauld Institute of Art but left after only a term of study. In 1946, he was appointed to an assistant keepership in the Department of Prints and Drawings at the British Museum. With Robin Ironside, he wrote Pre-Raphaelite Painters in 1948. His early work the revolved around assisting Arthur E. Popham and Philip Pouncey compile a catalogue of the British Museum's 14th- and 15th-century Italian drawings, which was published in 1950. He also assisted Johannes Wilde with his catalogue of Michelangelo's works in the department (1953), but his experience of working with Pouncey proved formative; in The Independent, Terence Mullaly wrote that Gere's collaboration with Pouncey "was one of the most fruitful in the whole history of the study of Italian art". The pair compiled another catalogue of the department's drawings, Raphael and His Circle, which appeared in 1962. In 1966, Gere was promoted to be Deputy Keeper of the department. He assisted with the production of Popham's catalogue of 16th-century Parmese drawings (1967) and in 1969 authored Taddeo Zuccaro, His Development Studies in His Drawings; two years later appeared his Il Manierismo a Roma (1971). In 1973, he was appointed Keeper of Prints and Drawings, filling the vacancy left by Popham's successor Edward Croft-Murray. He was elected a fellow of the British Academy in 1979.

In 1981, Gere retired from the Museum, but he continued with his researches and collaborations. With John Sparrow, he edited Geoffrey Madan's Notebooks: A Selection (1981). With Pouncey, he co-authored Artists Working in Rome c. 1550 to c. 1640 (1983), and with Nicholas Turner he wrote Drawings by Raphael in English Collections (1983).

Gere died in London 11 January 1995: he was survived by his wife Charlotte (née Douie; a historian of jewellery) and their two children.
