= Cesare Pascarella =

Italian dialect poet and painter (1858–1940)

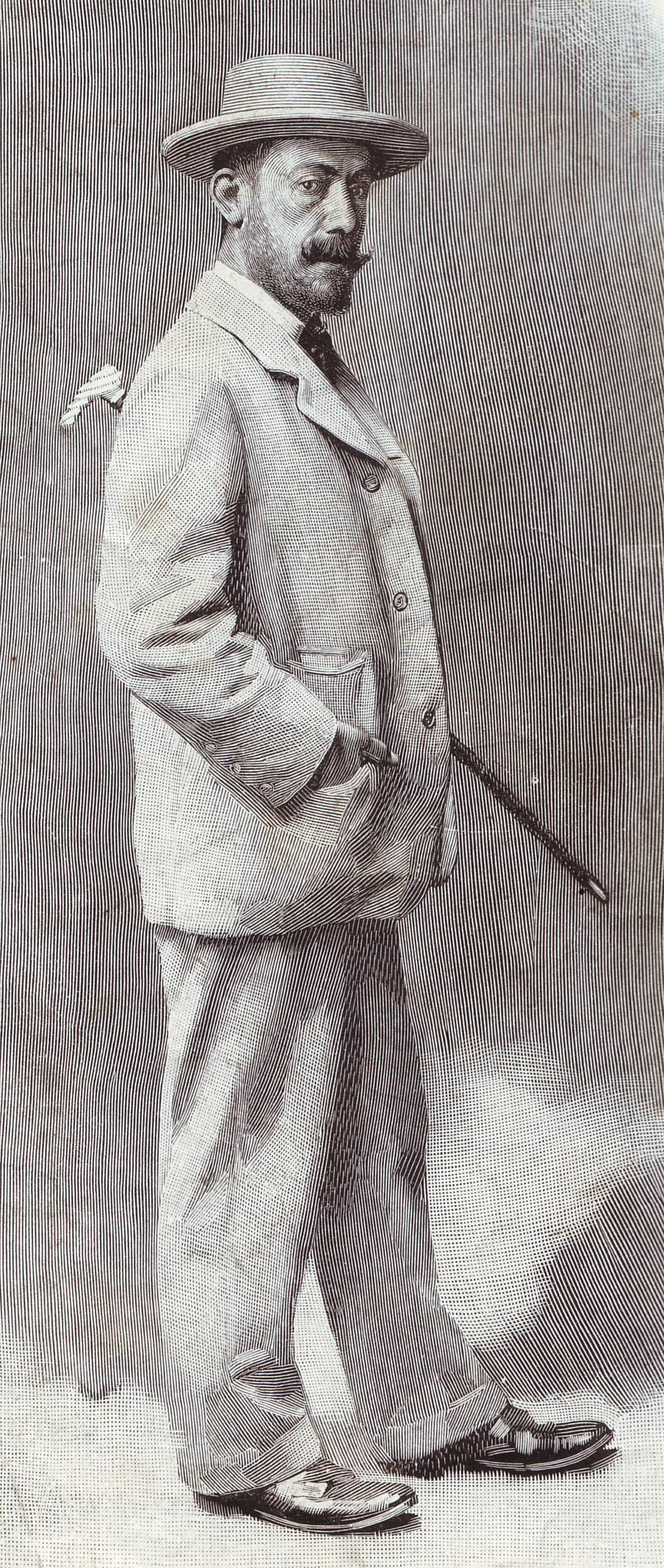
- Born: 28 April 1858 Rome, Papal States
- Died: 8 May 1940 (aged 82) Rome, Kingdom of Italy
- Occupation: Poet; Painter
- Genre: Dialect poetry
- Literary movement: Verismo

Signature
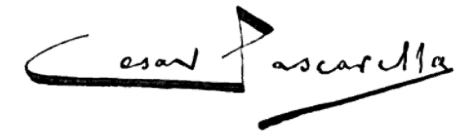

Cesare Pascarella (28 April 1858 – 8 May 1940), was an Italian dialect poet and a painter. He was appointed to the Royal Academy of Italy in 1930.

== Biography ==
Pascarella was born in Rome on 28 April 1858. He began his career as a journalist and illustrator for the Rome-based Capitan Fracassa and Fanfulla della domenica. His literary activity began in 1881 with the publication of sonnets in Romanesco dialect. In the same period, he made friends with Gabriele D'Annunzio. His first works of note, Er morto de campagna (1881) and La serenata (1882), were short narrative sonnet cycles, both in dialect, and with a darkly realistic colouring. The twenty-five sonnets of Villa Gloria (1886) retell a celebrated episode of the Risorgimento, the defeat of the Cairoli brothers just outside Rome, from the point of view of a plebeian Roman. The collection was hailed as a masterwork by Giosuè Carducci, who thought that Pascarella had raised dialect poetry to an epic level.

But Pascarella's best-known work is La scoperta dell'America (1894), an account of Columbus' voyage, which is both shrewdly humorous and deeply nationalistic. Pascarella spent the later part of his life working on Storia nostra, a sonnet sequence with epic pretensions, which aimed to narrate, through the language of a simple inhabitant of Rome, the history of the city from its origins to the present. The 267 sonnets which he completed were published posthumously in 1941. Pascarella founded in 1904 with other artists, among which Giuseppe Ferrari, the group "XXV della campagna romana".

Pascarella was an impressive reciter of his verse and highly rated as a poet in his lifetime. He was elected a member of the Royal Academy of Italy (now Accademia Nazionale dei Lincei) in 1930. Pascarella's papers, his library, photographs, paintings and drawings were purchased by the Royal Academy of Italy in 1940. The body is entirely ordered.

== Works ==
- Er morto de campagna (1881, sonnets)
- La serenata (1883, sonnets)
- Er fattaccio (1884, sonnets)
- Villa Glori (1886, sonnets)
- Cose der monno (1887)
- L'allustra scarpe (1887, philosophy)
- La scoperta dell'America (1893, sonnets)
- I sonetti (1900, sonnets)
- Le prose (1920, prose works)
- Viaggio in Ciociaria (1920)

Posthumous publications:

- Storia nostra
- Taccuini (published in 1961 by the Accademia dei Lincei)
- Storia nostra (published in 1961 by the Accademia dei Lincei)

== See also ==
- Romanesco dialect

== Bibliography ==
- Haller, Hermann W. (1992). "Columbus and Pascarella: America Rediscovered". Italica. 69 (3): 359–77. doi:10.2307/479390. JSTOR 479390.
- Rendina, Claudio (2000). Enciclopedia di Roma. Rome: Newton & Compton.
- Frenquellucci, Chiara (2010). "Roma nostra: The Poetry of Unification in the Sonnets of Cesare Pascarella". Annali d'Italianistica. 28: 49–75. JSTOR 24016387.
- Armocida, Daniela (2018). Pascarella pittore. Catalogo del Fondo presso la Biblioteca dei Lincei. Roma: Accademia Nazionale dei Lincei.
