= Charlotte Gere =

English art historian (1937–2026)

Charlotte Gere, OBE, FSA (23 May 1937 – 17 February 2026) was an English art historian, writer, and curator who specialized in 19th-century decorative arts. She was a leading authority on Victorian jewellery and interior design. In 1958, she married John Gere and they subsequently had two children together.

== Early life and education ==
Charlotte Gere was born on 23 May 1937 in London, the eldest child of Charles Douie, the secretary of University College London, and Margaret, née Cuthbert. She studied at the Slade School of Fine Art.

== Career and honours ==
After finishing her education, she worked at the British Museum as an indexer. In 1972, she published her first book, Victorian Jewellery Design. From 1981 to 1987, she was editor of the National Art Collections Fund magazine and annual reports. In 2003, she was appointed OBE for services to heritage, in particular for decorative arts and jewellery. In 2005, she was elected as a fellow of the Society of Antiquaries of London.

== Publications ==
Gere has published several books and essay on topics including jewellery, decorative arts, and paintings. Those publications include:

- Victorian Jewellery Design (1972)
- European & American Jewelry, 1830-1914 (1975)
- Marie Laurencin (1977)
- Nineteenth-century Decoration: The Art of the Interior (1989)
- Artists' Jewellery: Pre-Raphaelite to Arts and Crafts (1989)
- Nineteenth-Century Design from Pugin to Mackintosh (1994)
- Great Women Collectors (1999)
- The House Beautiful: Oscar Wilde and the Aesthetic Interior (2000)
- Jewellery in the Age of Queen Victoria: A Mirror to the World (2010)
