= Philip Pouncey =

English art historian, connoisseur and curator

Philip Michael Rivers Pouncey, CBE, FBA (15 February 1910 – 12 November 1990) was an English art historian, connoisseur and curator.

Born on 15 February 1910, Pouncey was the son of a priest; his elder brother Denys was a noted musician who served as organist and master of the choristers at Wells Cathedral from 1936 to 1970. Philip attended Marlborough College before studying English at Queens' College, Cambridge.

Pouncey volunteered at the Fitzwilliam Museum before working as an assistant keeper at the National Gallery from 1934 to 1945. During the Second World War, he was involved in organising the removal of artwork from museums around London to safer places in England; after a year supervising the National Gallery in London, he worked at Bletchley Park from 1942. In 1945, he took up an appointment as an assistant keeper at the British Museum. While there, he worked with Arthur Popham on the Catalogue of Italian Drawings in the British Museum, XIV–XV Centuries, which was published in 1950. In 1954, Pouncey was promoted to be a deputy keeper of prints and drawings. With John Gere, he wrote Raphael and His Circle (1962). In 1966, he left the British Museum to become a director at the auction house Sotheby's, where he remained until 1983. He co-authored with Gere Italian Artists Working in Rome c. 1550 – c. 1640 (1983). Pouncey was also the honorary keeper of Italian drawings at the Fitzwilliam Museum from 1973 or 1975.

An expert on Italian Renaissance art, Pouncey was elected a fellow of the British Academy in 1975 and was appointed a Commander of the Order of the British Empire in 1987. He died on 12 November 1990; he was survived by his wife, Myril, herself a noted art historian with whom he collaborated, and their two children.
