= Stopford Brooke =

Stopford Brooke may refer to:

- Stopford Brooke (chaplain) (1832–1916), Irish writer, critic, clergyman, and royal chaplain
- Stopford Brooke (politician) (1859–1938), British Member of Parliament, 1906–1910
