= Mario de Maria =

Italian painter

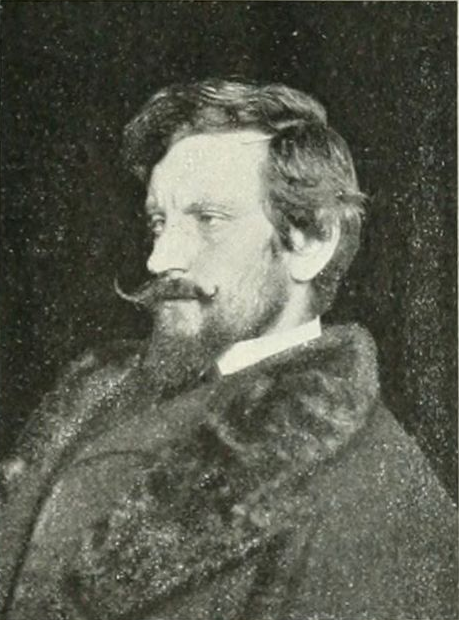
Mario de Maria

Mario or Marius de Maria (9 September 1852 – 1924) was an Italian painter, known for depicting nocturnal landscapes, and gaining the label by the contemporary poet Gabriele D’Annunzio, as the painter of moons.

== Biography ==
He was born in Bologna into a family with an artistic pedigree: his great-grandfather had been the orchestra director at St Petersburg, while his paternal grandfather, Giacomo de Maria, had been a Neoclassical sculptor, a pupil of Canova, and instructor at the Academy of Fine Arts of Bologna. His father, however, was a physician, and intended his son to follow his career. However, Mario enrolled in the Bolognese Academy of Fine Arts in 1872, and studied there irregularly until 1878. He studied under Antonio Puccinelli, but soon rebelled against the classicism of the school. He took some mentorship from Luigi Serra.

He was also friends and contemporary with contemporary Bolognese painters Raffaele Faccioli and Luigi Busi, and from painters outside Bologna, including Vincenzo Cabianca, Nino Costa, Vittore Grubicy, and Giulio Aristide Sartorio.

De Maria moved to Venice after 1894, painting mainly nocturnal vedute of the city. In 1912–1913, he designed the Casa dei Tre Oci, as his own residence located on the island of Giudecca in Venice.

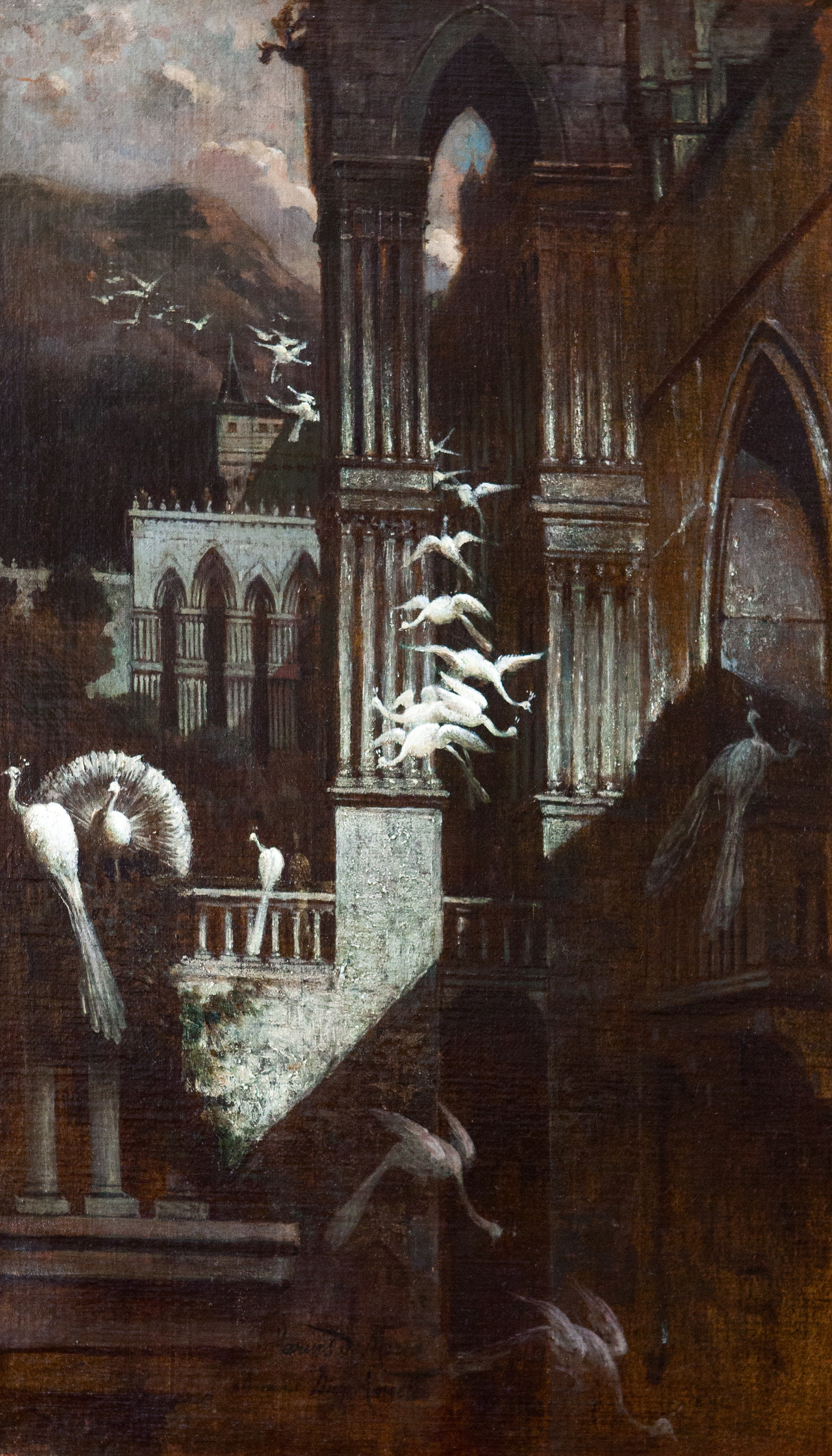
La danza dei pavoni o Eliana, c. 1886–1890

== Works ==
In 1881, resident of Bologna, he exhibited at Milan, The Cloister of the Abbey of S. Gregorio. In 1883, having moved to Rome, he displayed a Vedute of Piazza di San Trovaso at Moonlight. In 1886, De Maria became a member of the Roman Society of In Arte Libertas. In 1899, in Venice, he exhibited Cypresses of the Villa Massimo and The End of a Summer's Day. This latter picture was selected by De Maria as his contribution to the Paris Exposition of 1900. Rollins Willard ends his description of the artist with:

Whatever opinion might be formed as to its absolute merits, it was certainly of interest from the point of view of the art historian as evidence of a nascent reaction against naturalism, and a return to the older principles of art which the naturalistic movement drove out of favor.
