= Matthew Ridley Corbet =

English painter

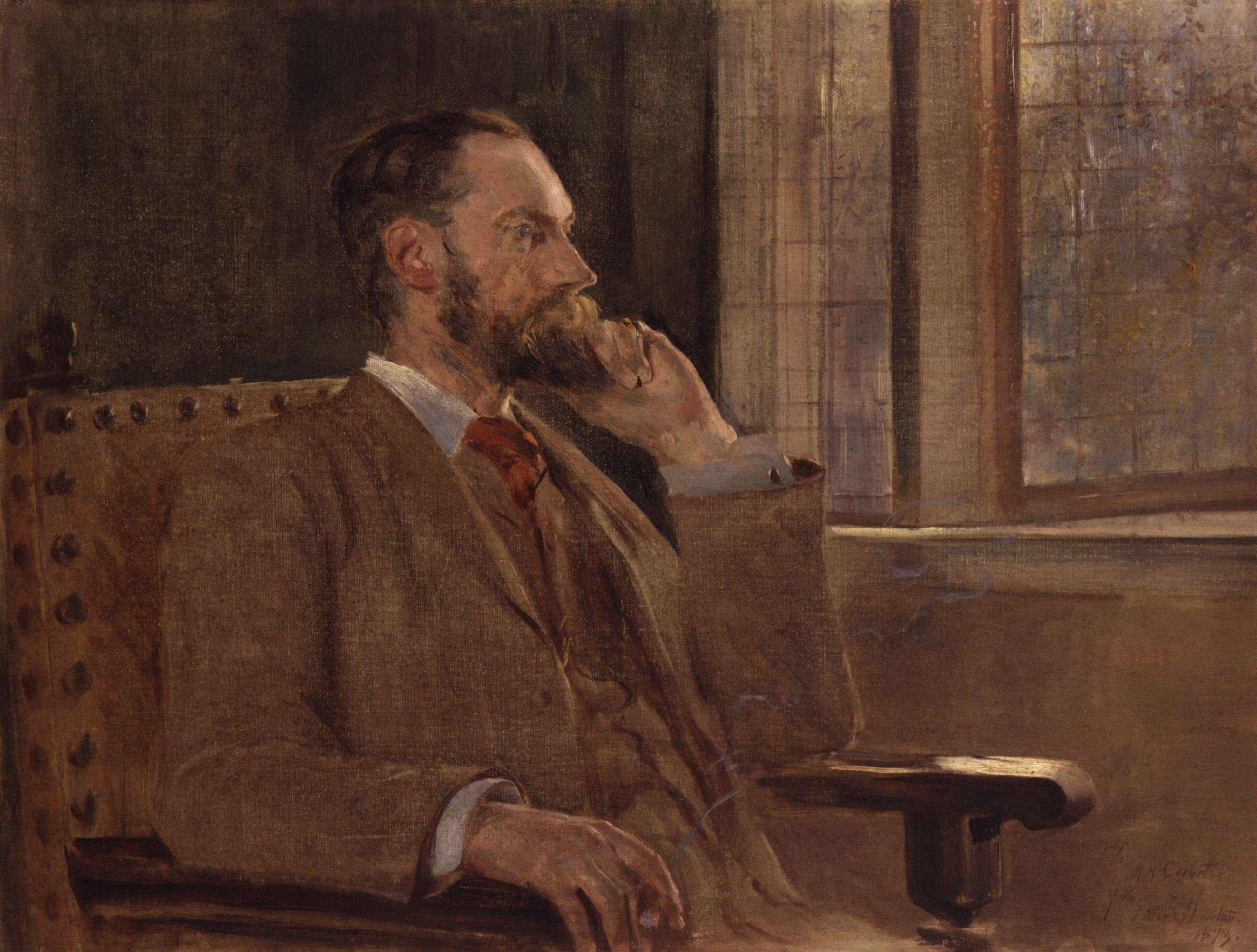
- Matthew Ridley Corbet, by John McLure Hamilton (1893)
- Born: 20 May 1850; London
- Died: 25 June 1902 (aged 52)
- Known for: Oil landscape
- Spouse: Edith Corbet

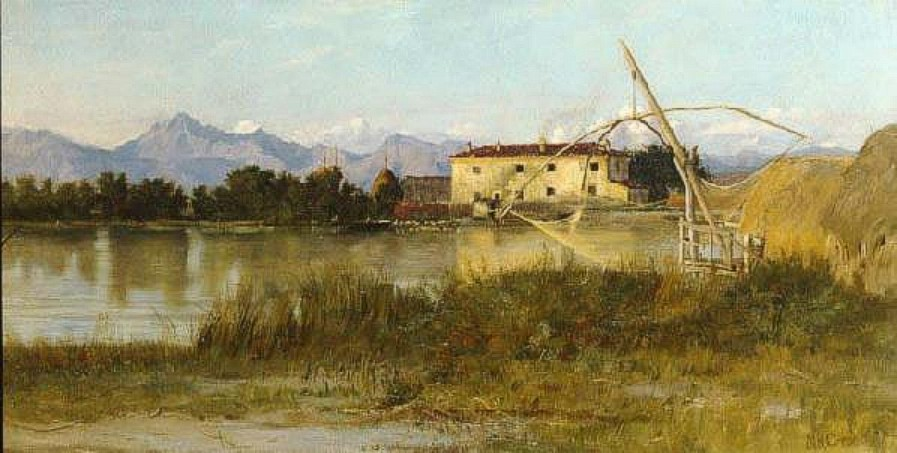
Etruscan Scene: The Carrara Mountains, Italy, c. 1890

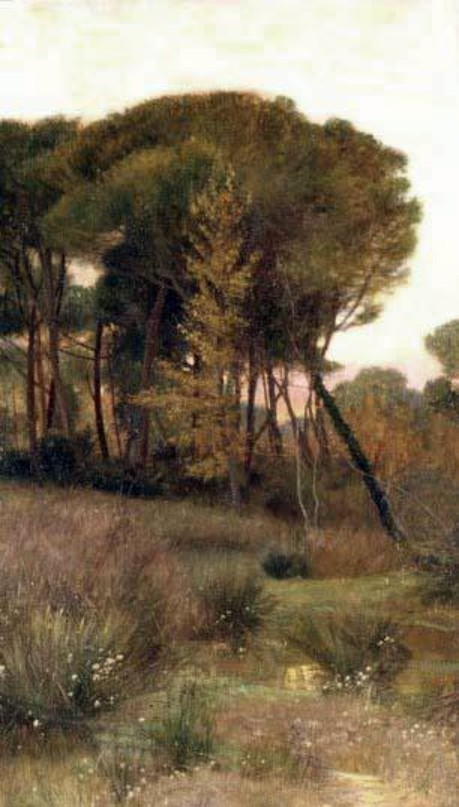
Evening, 1893

Matthew Ridley Corbet ARA (20 May 1850 – 25 June 1902) was a Victorian neoclassical painter.

== Life ==
Corbet was born on 20 May 1850 at South Willingham, Lincolnshire, the son of the Rev. Andrew Corbet and Marianne Ridley. He was educated at Cheltenham College.

He attended classes at the Slade School of Art under Alexander Davis Cooper and later at the Royal Academy Schools under Frederic Leighton, President of the Academy. Corbet travelled to Italy in 1880 and met the painter Giovanni Costa, a friend of Leighton's living in Rome. Corbet stayed in Italy, and spent the next three years there, where he lived, and painted with Costa, becoming one of the leading figures of the Macchiaioli school.

He concentrated on Italian landscapes and exhibited his new works at the Grosvenor Gallery, the New Gallery, the Royal Academy and the Paris Salon.

His paintings Sunrise, awarded a bronze medal at the Paris Exhibition of 1889; Morning Glory (1894), and Val d'Arno Evening (1901), bought under the terms of the Chantrey Bequest, are now in the Tate Gallery.

Corbet lived for a period in Kensington, where in 1876 he had a house, Peel Cottage, built to be his artists’ studio and residence. Later, Corbett relocated to St John's Wood. He died of pneumonia at his residence there on 25 June 1902.

== Family ==
In 1891 Corbet married Edith Murch (née Edenborough).
