= Johann Heinrich Richter =

German painter

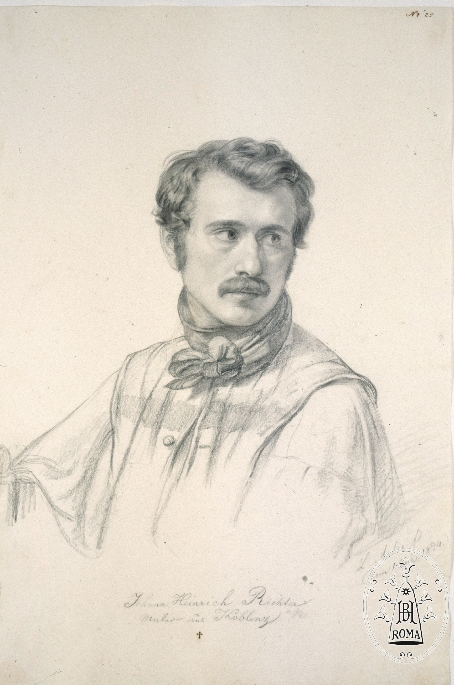
Portrait of Johann Heinrich Richter, drawn by Louis Asher, Rome 1834

Johann Heinrich Richter (1803–1845) was a German painter.

== Life ==
Johann Heinrich Richter was born in 1803 in Koblenz. From 1822 he trained to become a goldsmith at his father's workshop in Koblenz. Between 1822 and 1827 he studied in Paris under Anne-Louis Girodet-Trioson and François Gérard. After it he returned to Koblenz. Around 1830 he traveled to the Netherlands and again to Paris. From 1830 to 1833 he stayed in Munich. There he painted historical cartons at the Royal Academy of Fine Arts in Munich and at the same time he was very active as a portrait painter. Between 1832 and 1834, Richter was in Naples, Florence and Rome, accompanied by Horace Vernet and Léopold Robert. From 1836 he returned to Koblenz and worked primarily as a portrait painter. From 1840 to 1844 the artist lived and worked as a portrait painter in the Netherlands (The Hague, Middelburg). In December 1844 he moved to his native town Koblenz, where he died in 1845.

Several works by the artist have been sold at auctions, including 'Portrait of Prince Maximilianowitsch Romanowsky' sold at Van Ham Fine Art Auctions 'Fine Art ' in 2011. Richter's works are represented in various German and Dutch museums and are part of some private collections.

== Works ==
- 1825: Selbstporträt, Verbleib unbekannt (Becker 1971, S. 78)
- 1826: Jeune fille et son frère en bordure de parc
- 1826: Portrat Johannes Müller, freund
- 1827: Der Heilige Sebastian nach Perugino, Verbleib unbekannt (Stramberg 1854, S. 524; Artistisches München 1836, S. 128)
- 1827: Porträt Karl Baedeker
- 1833/34: Bildnis des Papstes Pius VII. nach Jacques Louis David, 1833/34, Verbleib unbekannt (TB).
- 1834: La ciociara
- 1835: Fortunata Segatori
- 1835: Portrat young officer
- 1835: Portrat einer lady
- 1839: Portrat des Fursten Maximilianowitsch Romanowsky
- 1840: Portrat Gosso Bernardus van Bronkhorst (1778-1860)
- 1840: Portrat Susanna Elisabeth Christina Hiddingh (1780-1841)
- 1840: Portrat Josina Adelaide Antoinette van Rappard (1800-1894)
- 1840: Portrat James Albert Henry de la Sarraz (1787-1877)
- 1840: Portrat Bavius Gijsbertus Rinia van Nauta (1787-1860)
- 1841: Portrat Jan Corver Hooft (1779-1855)
- 1841: Portrat Willem_Maurits_de_Brauw_(1838-1898) (1810-1874)
- 1844: Portrat Frans Keller
- 184?: Dobbelportrat Karel Willem de Jonge (1789-1852) und Henriëtte van Breugel
- 184?: Portrat Willem Marinus Hendrik de Jonge (1824-1898)
- 1843: Portret Marinus Christianus de Crane (1783-1865)
- 1844: Portrat Adriaan Isaac Snouck Hurgronje (1780-1849)
- 1844: Portrat Johanna Adriana Maria Lambrechtsen (1792-1864)
- 1844: Portrat van Johanna Ermerins (1787-1866)
- unknown: Portrait of a maiden
- unknown: Italian woman with water jug
- unknown: Portrat Elisabeth Adriana Martini (1811-1841)
- unknown: Portrat Eugène de Beauharnais
- unknown: Portrat Conrad Marius Josias Bruhn (1797-)
- unknown: Maximilian von Wied-Neuwied mit dem Botokuden Quäck auf der Jagd
