= Giovanni Costa (painter, born 1826) =

Italian painter (1826–1903)

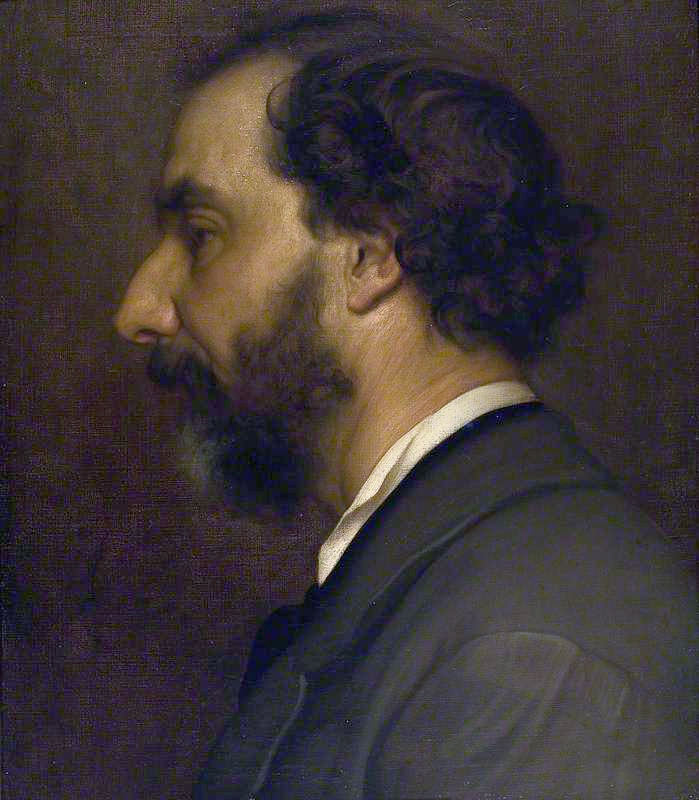
- Portrait of Professor Giovanni Costa by Lord Frederic Leighton, oil on canvas, 48.5 x 39 cm, 1878, now in the Leighton House Museum
- Born: 15 October 1826; Rome
- Died: 31 January 1903 (aged 76); Pisa
- Movement: Macchiaioli, Etruscan School of Art

Giovanni Costa (15 October 1826 – 31 January 1903), often known as Nino Costa, was an Italian landscape painter and patriotic revolutionary. He was one of the most international Italian painters of his time and an inspiration to compatriots and non-Italian artists alike. Was one of the founders of the Etruscan School of Art.

== Biography ==
Giovanni Costa was born in Rome on 15 October 1826, the fourteenth of the sixteen children of Gioacchino Costa (died 1842) and Maria Chiappi (died 1857). His father was from Santa Margherita Ligure and, as a young man, had moved to Rome, where he opened a wool-spinning factory and achieved wealth and position. The family lived in a large house in Piazza San Francesco a Ripa, in Trastevere, close to the factory.

When he was 12, Giovanni was introduced to the neo-classical painter Baron Vincenzo Camuccini, who encouraged him to work from nature and from what he saw around him. Soon after, he was sent to the Jesuit college at Montefiascone, where he remained for five years.

Costa returned to Rome in 1843, the year after the death of his father, and for two years attended the Collegio Bandinelli in the via Giulia, founded by Bartolommeo Bandinelli in 1678, where he was taught drawing by Luigi Durantini. He then worked for a short time in the studio of Vincenzo Camuccini before entering the schools of the Accademia di San Luca, where he studied under Francesco Coghetti, Francesco Podesti and Filippo Agricola.

He fought under Garibaldi in 1848, and served as a volunteer in the war of 1859; his enthusiasm for Italian unity was actively shown again in 1870, when he was the first to mount the breach in the assault on Rome near the Porta Pia.

He had meanwhile settled in Florence, where his fight for the independence of art from worn-out traditions was no less strenuous. Here he completed a Donne sulla spiaggia di Porto d'Anzio (Girl on the Beach of Porto d'Anzio) and his 1852 canvas Donne che imbarcano legna a Porto d'Anzio (Women Embarking Wood in the Port of Anzio), which he had painted from life studies on the Roman coast. The work was admired by Giovanni Fattori, and showed it at the 1863 Paris Salon and the 1903 Venice Biennale... The painting influenced the Macchiaioli in Tuscany and was later praised by Giorgio de Chirico in a 1919 review for Valori plastici.

He also became known as a landscape painter of remarkable originality and of great influence in the return to minute observation of nature. He painted mainly rustic scenes involving herders and cattle. He was a major inspiration to the artists known as the Macchiaioli, and also had many English and American friends and followers, notably Elihu Vedder, Edgar Barclay, Matthew Ridley Corbet (1850–1902) and his wife Edith Corbet, and Lord Carlisle, and was closely associated with Corot and the Barbizon school, whom he met while visiting Paris. In 1853, he established a lifelong friendship with Frederick Leighton, who was then sojourning in Rome. His exile from Rome lasted until 1862.

== Etruscan School of Art ==
In the winter of 1883–1884, Costa founded the Etruscan School (Scuola Etrusca), an association of Italian and British landscape painters who had begun meeting in Rome in January 1883. The group took its name from Costa's nickname, "The Etruscan", referencing his birthplace in Trastevere within ancient Etruria.Painters including George Howard, Edgar Barclay, Norberto Pazzini, and Napoleone Parisani were a part of it and created panoramic plein-air landscapes in muted tones and atmospheric sentiment rather than academic realism.

== Career and reception ==
In 1870, Costa was elected Professor of Painting at the Accademia di Belle Arti in Florence. Following the capture of Rome later that year, he re-established his primary studio at Via Margutta in Rome, which served as a focal point for Italian and foreign artists until 1902.

Costa exhibited internationally throughout the latter half of the nineteenth century. In France, his A Study of Olive Trees was accepted at the Salon des Refusés in Paris in 1863. In Italy, he showed work at the 1861 Italian National Exhibition in Florence, organised an exhibition on the Pincio in Rome in 1873, and participated in the Venice Biennale, including its 1903 edition. In Britain, he exhibited at the Royal Academy, the Grosvenor Gallery, and the New Gallery. In 1882, with the support of Leighton and George Howard, The Fine Art Society in London held an exhibition of sixty of his paintings, where the Prince of Wales bought Bella di Lerici (now in the Royal Collection). In 1885, Costa helped found the artists' group In Arte Libertas, which held its first exhibition in Rome in 1886. His paintings are held in public collections including the National Gallery and the Tate Gallery in London, the Galleria Nazionale d'Arte Moderna in Rome, and the Pitti Palace in Florence. A memorial exhibition of his pictures was held in London in 1904.

During his lifetime, Costa sold paintings to British collectors including George Howard, Frederic Leighton, Stopford Brooke, and Edward VII, Prince of Wales. In a 2017 review in The Art Newspaper of Arnika Schmidt's monograph Nino Costa (1826–1903): Transnational Exchange in European Landscape Painting, curator Charlotte Gere wrote that Costa linked Italian, French, British, and German landscape painters during his career. At auction, In the Campagna sold at Christie's in London in November 2007 for £22,100 against an estimate of £4,000–£6,000. Later sales include Landscape, from the collection of Accursio Accorsi, which sold for €6,820 at Gregory's Casa d'Aste in Bologna in May 2021; Dawn – Study of the Awakening of Nature, which sold for £7,200 at Mallams in April 2022; and Portrait of a Young Woman, which sold for $4,062 at Neal Auction Company in New Orleans in January 2026.

He died at Marina di Pisa on 31 January 1903. He was buried initially in the cemetery of Pisa but Rome decreed a public funeral for him and his remains were moved to Rome to the cemetery at Campo Verano.

== Selected paintings ==
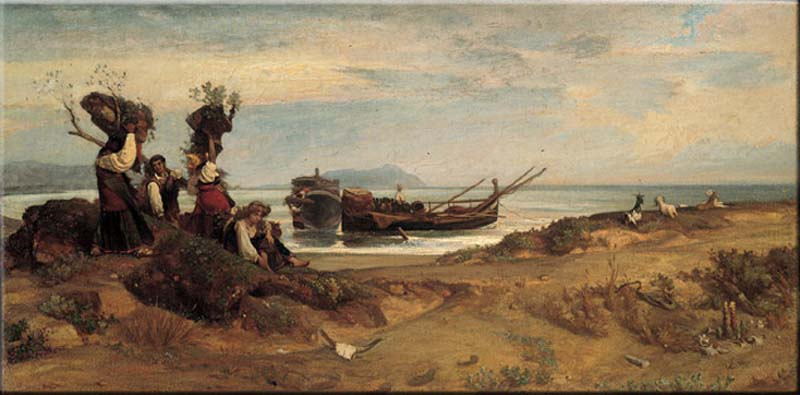
Women Loading Wood in Porto d'Anzio, 1850–52

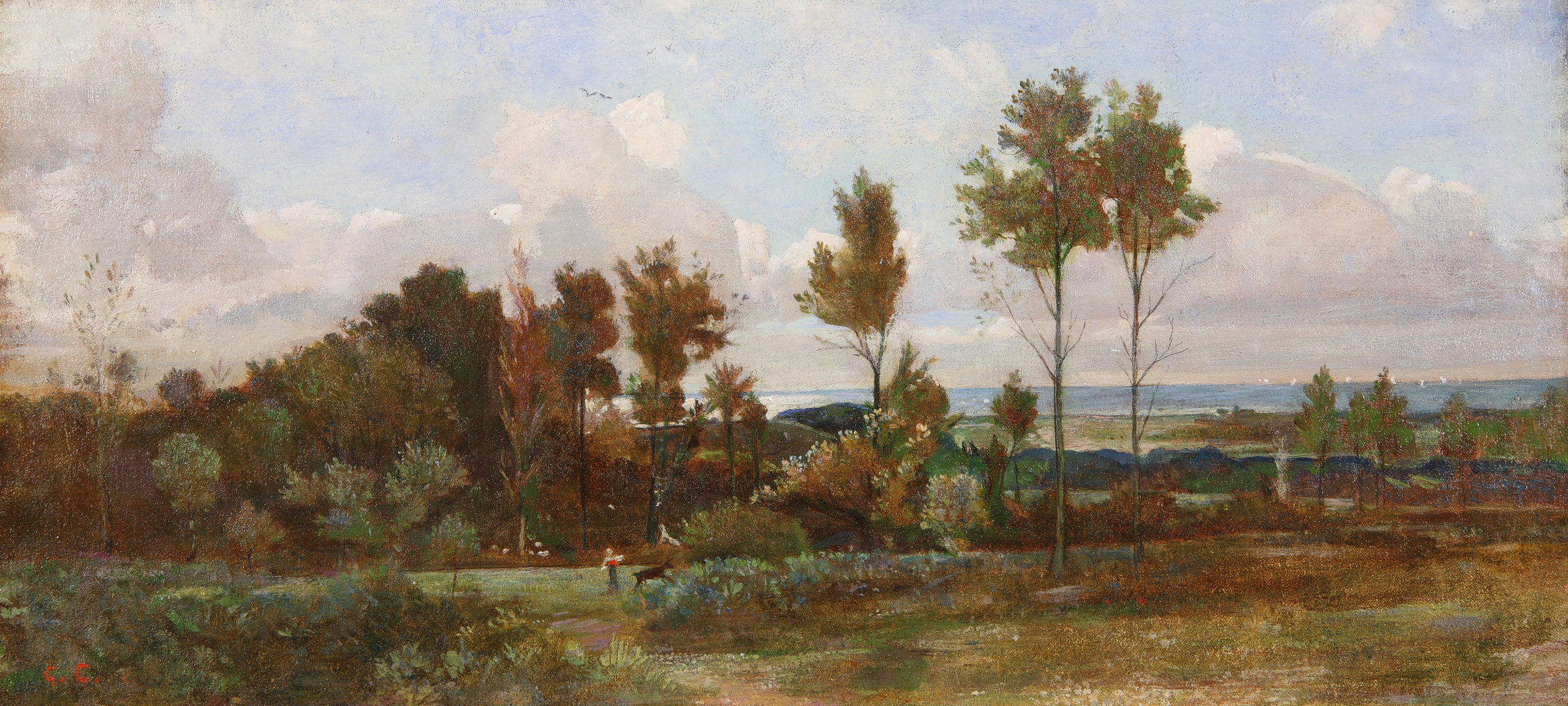
Landscape Near the Sea, 1885

The Island of Circe Seen from Terracina, 1896

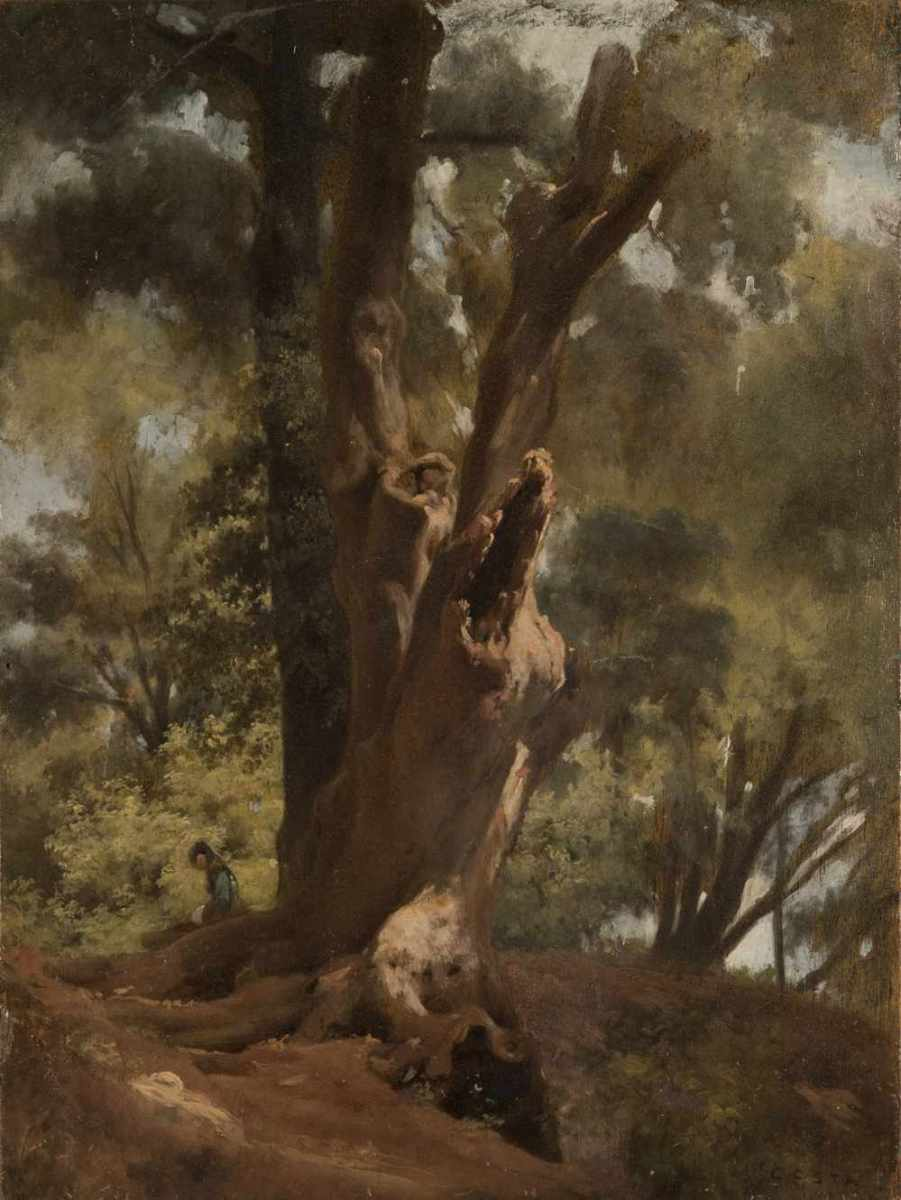
Meditating Under a Tree, 1855-60

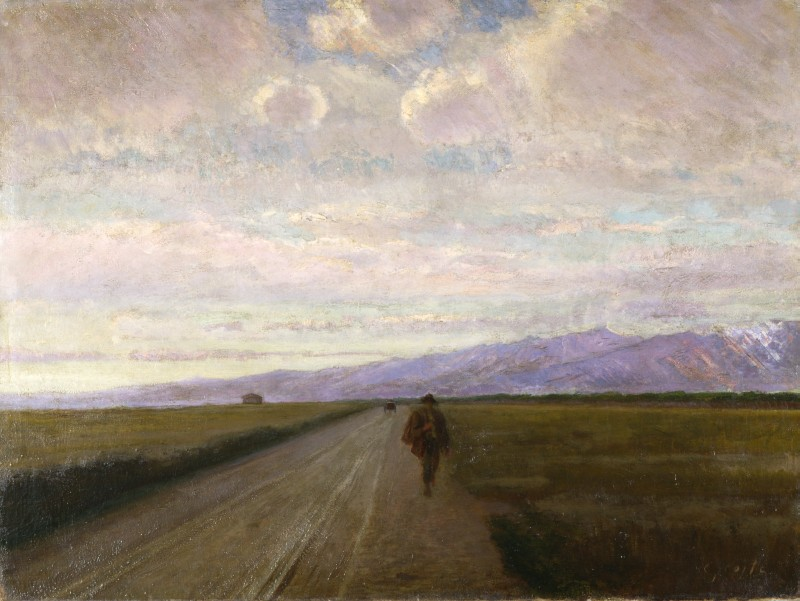
Road on the Plain, 1890
