= Natural (disambiguation) =

Natural is an adjective that refers to nature.

Natural or The Natural(s) may also refer to:

== Music ==
- Natural sign, a musical notation
- Natural (group), an American boy group

=== Albums ===
- Natural (Crystal Kay album), originally titled Crystal Kay, 2003
- Natural (The Mekons album), 2007
- Natural (Orange Range album), 2005
- Natural (Peter Andre album) or the title song (see below), 1996
- Natural (The Special Goodness album), 2012
- Natural (T-Square album), 1990
- The Natural (Haystak album), 2002
- The Natural (Mic Geronimo album) or the title song (see below), 1995
- The Naturals, by Catherine, or the title song, 2007

=== Songs ===
- "Natural" (Imagine Dragons song), 2018
- "Natural" (Peter Andre song), 1997
- "Natural" (S Club 7 song), 2000
- "The Natural" (song), by Mic Geronimo, 1995
- "Natural", by D'Masiv from Persiapan, 2012
- "Natural", by Howard Jones from Human's Lib, 1984
- "Natural", by InMe from Overgrown Eden, 2003
- "Natural", by P-Model from Potpourri
- "Natural", by Woody, 2019
- "Natural", by Zayn from Icarus Falls, 2018

== Sports and games ==
- Butch Reed (1954–2021), or "The Natural", American professional wrestler
- The Naturals, an American professional wrestling duo
- Northwest Arkansas Naturals, a Minor League Baseball team
- Natural (gambling), in some games of chance, a specific type of good outcome
- Natural, a style of bidding in contract bridge

== Other uses ==
- Natural (4GL), an Adabas programming language
- Natural (archaeology), a sediment containing no evidence of human activity
- The Natural, a 1952 novel by Bernard Malamud
- The Natural (film), a 1984 adaptation of Malamud's novel
- The Naturals (book series), a 2013–2017 series of young adult novels by Jennifer Lynn Barnes
- The Natural, a shortly cropped derivative of the afro hairstyle

== See also ==
- Natural foods
- Natural history, a broad area of the natural sciences concerned with living things
- Natural logarithm, the logarithm to base e = 2.71828…
- Natural number, in mathematics, numbers 0, 1, 2, 3, …
- Natural philosophy
- Natural product
- Natural resource
- Natural theology
- Natural transformation in mathematics
- Mr. Natural (disambiguation)
- Natural child, illegitimate child
- Natur all, a 2004 album by Cactus Jack
- Naturalism (disambiguation)
- Naturally (disambiguation)
- Nature (disambiguation)
- Unnatural (disambiguation)
