= Naturalness =

Naturalness may refer to:

- Naturalness (physics)
- Naturalness (philosophy)
- Naturalness (Dal Shabet EP), 2016
- Ziran, or Naturalness, a key concept in Daoism

== See also ==
- Naturalism (disambiguation)
- Nature (disambiguation)
