= Natch =

Natch may refer to:

- Nautch (or natch), a court dance of royal India
- Natch, a freeware chess program
- Natch, a character in the 2012 video game Steel Battalion: Heavy Armor
- Capt. Natch Austen, a character in the TV series China Beach (1988–1991)

== See also ==
- Natural (disambiguation)
