= Representation (arts) =

Signs that stand in for and take the place of something else

Representation is the use of signs that stand in for and take the place of something else. It is through representation that people organize the world and reality through the act of naming its elements. Signs are arranged in order to form semantic constructions and express relations.

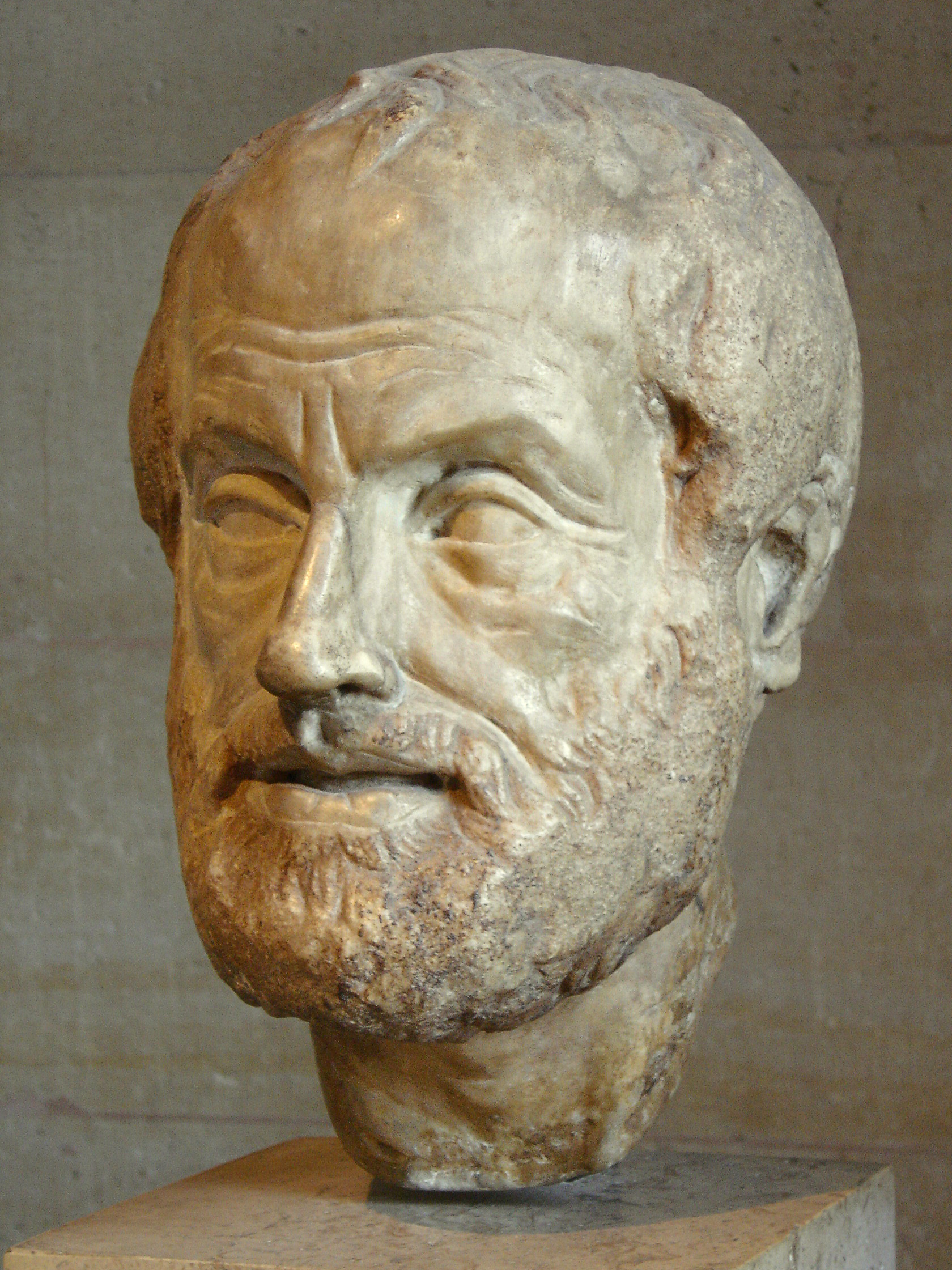
Bust of Aristotle, Greek philosopher

For many philosophers, both ancient and modern, man is regarded as the "representational animal" or animal symbolicum, the creature whose distinct character is the creation and the manipulation of signs – things that "stand for" or "take the place of" something else.

Representation has been associated with aesthetics (art) and semiotics (signs). Scholar of English and art history W. J. T. Mitchell says "representation is an extremely elastic notion, which extends all the way from a stone representing a man to a novel representing the day in the life of several Dubliners".

The term representation carries a range of meanings and interpretations. In literary theory, representation is commonly defined in three ways:

1. to look like or resemble;
2. to stand in for something or someone;
3. to present a second time, to re-present.

The reflection on representation began with early literary theory in the ideas of Plato and Aristotle, and has evolved into a significant component of language, Saussurian and communication studies.

== Defining representation ==
Reproduction of the Mona Lisa

To represent is "to bring to mind by description," also "to symbolize, to be the embodiment of;" from representer (12c.), from L. repraesentare, from re-, intensive prefix, + praesentare "to present," lit. "to place before".

A representation is a type of recording in which the sensory information about a physical object is described in a medium. The degree to which an artistic representation resembles the object it represents is a function of resolution and does not bear on the denotation of the word. For example, both the Mona Lisa and a child's crayon drawing of Lisa del Giocondo would be considered representational, and any preference for one over the other would need to be understood as a matter of aesthetics.

== History ==
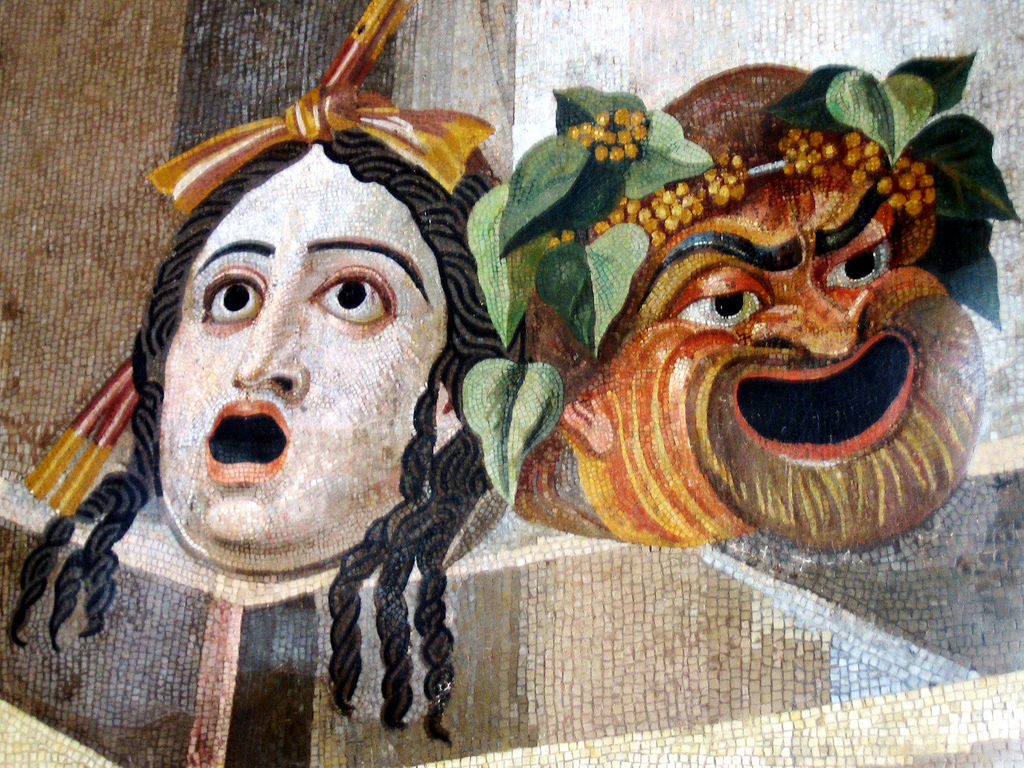
Greek theatrical masks depicted in a mosaic in Hadrian's Villa

Since ancient times representation has played a central role in understanding literature, aesthetics and semiotics. Plato and Aristotle are key figures in early literary theory who considered literature as simply one form of representation. Aristotle for instance, considered each mode of representation, verbal, visual or musical, as being natural to human beings. Therefore, what distinguishes humans from other animals is their ability to create and manipulate signs. Aristotle deemed mimesis as natural to man, therefore considered representations as necessary for people's learning and being in the world.

Plato, in contrast, looked upon representation with more caution. He recognised that literature is a representation of life, yet also believed that representations intervene between the viewer and the real. This creates worlds of illusion leading one away from the "real things". Plato thus believed that representation needs to be controlled and monitored due to the possible dangers of fostering antisocial emotions or the imitation of evil.

Aristotle went on to say it was a definitively human activity. From childhood man has an instinct for representation, and in this respect man differs from the other animals that he is far more imitative and learns his first lessons though imitating things. Aristotle discusses representation in three ways:

1. the object: the symbol being represented;
2. the manner: the way the symbol is represented;
3. the means: the material that is used to represent it.

The means of literary representation is language. An important part of representation is the relationship between what the material and what it represents. The questions arising from this are, "A stone may represent a man but how? And by what and by what agreement, does this understanding of the representation occur?"

One apprehends reality only through representations of reality, through texts, discourses, images: there is no such thing as direct or unmediated access to reality. But because one can see reality only through representation it does not follow that one does not see reality at all. Reality is always more extensive and complicated than any system of representation can comprehend, and we always sense that this is so-representation never "gets" reality, which is why human history has produced so many and changing ways of trying to get it.

Consequently, throughout the history of human culture, people have become dissatisfied with language's ability to express reality and as a result have developed new modes of representation. It is necessary to construct new ways of seeing reality, as people only know reality through representation. From this arise the contrasting and alternate theories and representational modes of abstraction, realism and modernism, to name a few.

== Contemporary ideas about representation ==
It is from Plato's caution that in the modern era many are aware of political and ideological issues and the influences of representations. It is impossible to divorce representations from culture and the society that produces them. In the contemporary world there exist restrictions on subject matter, limiting the kinds of representational signs allowed to be employed, as well as boundaries that limit the audience or viewers of particular representations. In motion picture rating systems, M and R rated films are an example of such restrictions, highlighting also society's attempt to restrict and modify representations to promote a certain set of ideologies and values. Despite these restrictions, representations still have the ability to take on a life of their own once in the public sphere, and can not be given a definitive or concrete meaning; as there will always be a gap between intention and realization, original and copy.

Consequently, for each of the above definitions there exists a process of communication and message sending and receiving. In such a system of communication and representations it is inevitable that potential problems may arise; misunderstandings, errors, and falsehoods. The accuracy of the representations can by no means be guaranteed, as they operate in a system of signs that can never work in isolation from other signs or cultural factors. For instance, the interpretation and reading of representations function in the context of a body of rules for interpreting, and within a society many of these codes or conventions are informally agreed upon and have been established over a number of years. Such understandings however, are not set in stone and may alter between times, places, peoples and contexts. How though, does this 'agreement' or understanding of representation occur? It has generally been agreed by semioticians that representational relationships can be categorised into three distinct headings: icon, symbol and index.

For instance objects and people do not have a constant meaning, but their meanings are fashioned by humans in the context of their culture, as they have the ability to make things mean or signify something. Viewing representation in such a way focuses on understanding how language and systems of knowledge production work to create and circulate meanings. Representation is simply the process in which such meanings are constructed. In much the same way as the post-structuralists, this approach to representation considers it as something larger than any one single representation. A similar perspective is viewing representation as part of a larger field, as W. J. T. Mitchell, saying, "…representation (in memory, in verbal descriptions, in images) not only 'mediates' our knowledge (of slavery and of many other things), but obstructs, fragments, and negates that knowledge" and proposes a move away from the perspective that representations are merely "objects representing", towards a focus on the relationships and processes through which representations are produced, valued, viewed and exchanged.

== Peirce and representation ==
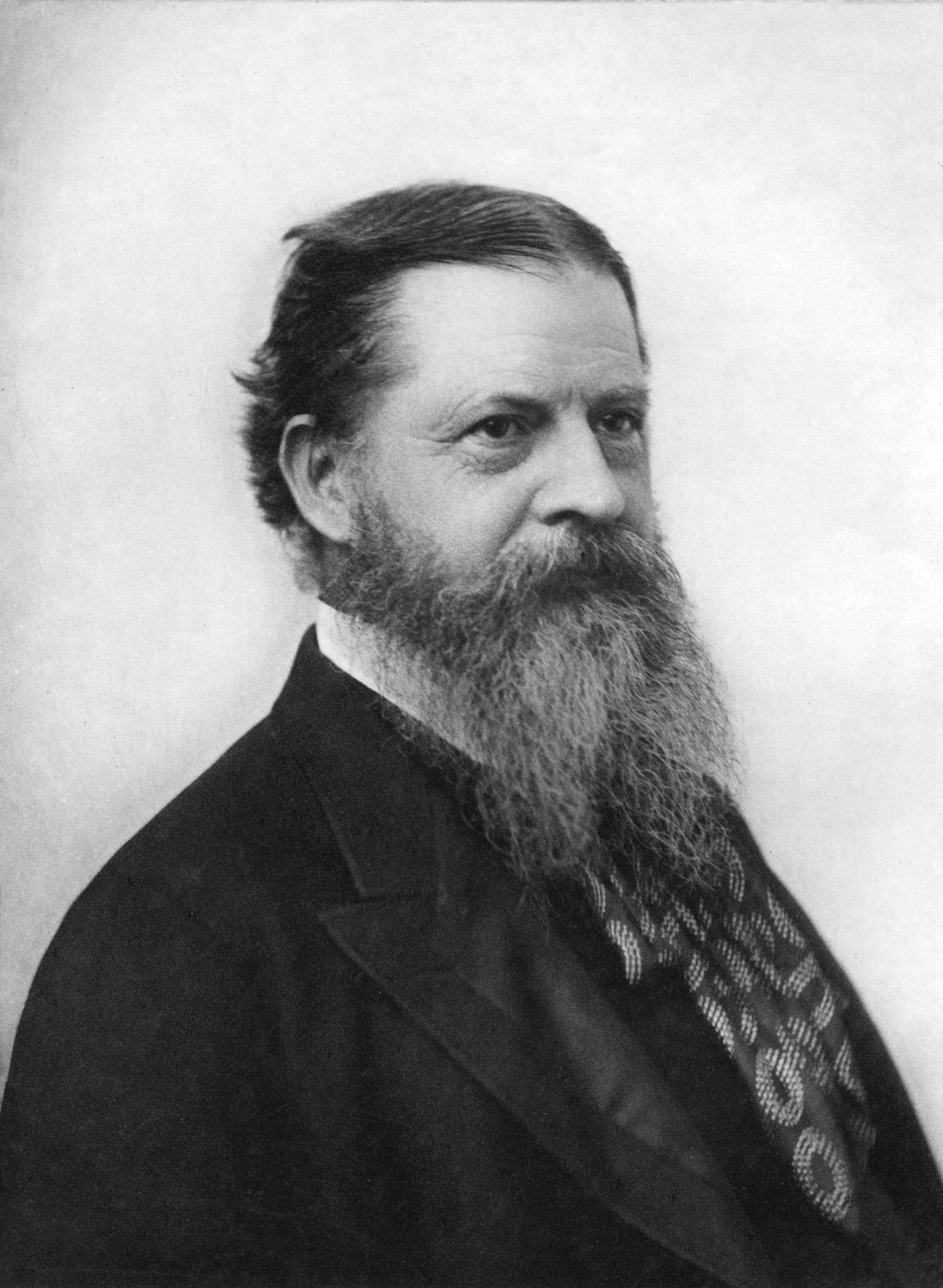
Charles Sanders Peirce

Charles Sanders Peirce (1839–1914) was an innovative and accomplished logician, mathematician, and scientist, and founded philosophical pragmatism. Peirce's central ideas were focused on logic and representation.

=== Semiotics and logic ===
Peirce distinguished philosophical logic as logic per se from mathematics of logic. He regarded logic (per se) as part of philosophy, as a normative field following esthetics and ethics, as more basic than metaphysics, and as the art of devising methods of research. He argued that, more generally, as inference, "logic is rooted in the social principle", since inference depends on a standpoint that, in a sense, is unlimited.

Peirce held that logic is formal semiotic, the formal study of signs in the broadest sense, not only signs that are artificial, linguistic, or symbolic, but also signs that are semblances or are indexical such as reactions. He held that "all this universe is perfused with signs, if it is not composed exclusively of signs", along with their representational and inferential relations, interpretable by mind or quasi-mind (whatever works like a mind despite perhaps not actually being one); the focus here is on sign action in general, not psychology, linguistics, or social studies).

He argued that, since all thought takes time, "all thought is in signs" and sign processes ("semiosis") and that the three irreducible elements of semiosis are (1) the sign (or representamen), (2) the (semiotic) object, the sign's subject matter, which the sign represents and which can be anything thinkable—quality, brute fact, or law—and even fictional (Prince Hamlet), and (3) the interpretant (or interpretant sign), which is the sign's meaning or ramification as formed into a kind of idea or effect that is a further sign, for example, a translation. Even when a sign represents by a resemblance or factual connection independent of interpretation, the sign is a sign because it is at least potentially interpretable. A sign depends on its object in a way that enables (and, in a sense, determines) interpretation, forming an interpretant which, in turn, depends on the sign and on the object as the sign depends on the object and is thus a further sign, enabling and determining still further interpretation, further interpretants. That essentially triadic process is logically structured to perpetuate itself and is what defines sign, object, and interpretant.

An object either (1) is immediate to a sign, and that is the object as represented in the sign, or (2) is a dynamic object, which is the object as it really is, on which the immediate object is founded. Usually, an object in question, such as Hamlet or the planet Neptune, is a special or partial object. A sign's total object is the object's universe of discourse, the totality of things in that world to which one attributes the object. An interpretant is either (1) immediate to a sign, for example a word's usual meaning, a kind of interpretive quality or possibility present in the sign, or (2) dynamic, an actual interpretant, for example a state of agitation, or (3) final or normal, a question's true settlement, which would be reached if thought or inquiry were pushed far enough, a kind of norm or ideal end with which any actual interpretant may, at most, coincide.

Peirce said that, in order to know to what a sign refers, the mind needs some sort of experience of the sign's object, experience outside, and collateral to, the given sign or sign system. In that context he spoke of collateral experience, collateral observation, collateral acquaintance, all in much the same terms. For example, art work can exploit both the richness and the limits of the audience's experience; a novelist, in disguising a roman à clef, counts on the typical reader's lack of personal experience with the actual individual people portrayed. Then the reader refers the signs and interpretants in a general way to an object or objects of the kind that is represented (intentionally or otherwise) by the novel. In all cases, the object (be it a quality or fact or law or even fictional) determines the sign to an interpretant through one's collateral experience with the object, collateral experience in which the object is newly found or from which it is recalled, even if it is experience with an object of imagination as called into being by the sign, as can happen not only in fiction but in theories and mathematics, all of which can involve mental experimentation with the object under specifiable rules and constraints. Through collateral experience even a sign that consists in a chance semblance of an absent object is determined by that object.

Peirce held that logic has three main parts:

1. Speculative grammar, on meaningfulness, conditions for meaning. Study of significatory elements and combinations.
2. Logical critic, on validity, conditions for true representation. Critique of arguments in their various distinct modes.
3. Speculative rhetoric, or methodeutic, on conditions for determining interpretations. Methodology of inquiry in its mutually interacting modes.

1. Speculative Grammar. By this, Peirce means discovering relations among questions of how signs can be meaningful and of what kinds of signs there are, how they combine, and how some embody or incorporate others. Within this broad area, Peirce developed three interlocked universal trichotomies of signs, depending respectively on (1) the sign itself, (2) how the sign stands for its object, and (3) how the sign stands for its object to its interpretant. Each trichotomy is divided according to the phenomenological category involved: Firstness (quality of feeling, essentially monadic), secondness (reaction or resistance, essentially dyadic), or thirdness (representation or mediation, essentially triadic).

1. Qualisigns, sinsigns, and legisigns. Every sign is either (qualisign) a quality or possibility, or (sinsign) an actual individual thing, fact, event, state, etc., or (legisign) a norm, habit, rule, law.
2. Icons, indices, and symbols. Every sign refers either (icon) through similarity to its object, or (index) through factual connection to its object, or (symbol) through interpretive habit or norm of reference to its object.
3. Rhemes, dicisigns, and arguments. Every sign is interpreted either as (rheme) term-like, standing for its object in respect of quality, or as (dicisign) proposition-like, standing for its object in respect of fact, or as (argument) argumentative, standing for its object in respect of habit or law. This is the trichotomy of all signs as building blocks of inference.

Lines of joint classification of signs. Every sign is:
	1.		2.		3.
I.	Qualisign	or	Sinsign	or	Legisign
and
II.	Icon	or	Index	or	Symbol
and
III.	Rheme	or	Dicisign	or	Argument

Some (not all) sign classes from different trichotomies intersect each other. For example, a qualisign is always an icon, and is never an index or a symbol. He held that there were only ten classes of signs logically definable through those three universal trichotomies. He thought that there were further such universal trichotomies as well. Also, some signs need other signs in order to be embodied. For example, a legisign (also called a type), such as the word "the," needs to be embodied in a sinsign (also called a token), for example an individual instance of the word "the", in order to be expressed. Another form of combination is attachment or incorporation: an index may be attached to, or incorporated by, an icon or a symbol.

Peirce called an icon apart from a label, legend, or other index attached to it, a "hypoicon", and divided the hypoicon into three classes: (a) the image, which depends on a simple quality; (b) the diagram, whose internal relations, mainly dyadic or so taken, represent by analogy the relations in something; and (c) the metaphor, which represents the representative character of a sign by representing a parallelism in something else. A diagram can be geometric, or can consist in an array of algebraic expressions, or even in the common form "All __ is ___" which is subjectable, like any diagram, to logical or mathematical transformations.

2. Logical critic or Logic Proper. That is how Peirce refers to logic in the everyday sense. Its main objective, for Peirce, is to classify arguments and determine the validity and force of each kind. He sees three main modes: abductive inference (guessing, inference to a hypothetical explanation); deduction; and induction. A work of art may embody an inference process and be an argument without being an explicit argumentation. That is the difference, for example, between most of War and Peace and its final section.

3. Speculative rhetoric or methodeutic. For Peirce this is the theory of effective use of signs in investigations, expositions, and applications of truth. Here Peirce coincides with Morris's notion of pragmatics, in his interpretation of this term. He also called it "methodeutic", in that it is the analysis of the methods used in inquiry.

=== Using signs and objects ===
Peirce concluded that there are three ways in which signs represent objects. They underlie his most widely known trichotomy of signs:

- Icon
- Index
- Symbol

Icon

This term refers to signs that represent by resemblance, such as portraits and some paintings though they can also be natural or mathematical. Iconicity is independent of actual connection, even if it occurs because of actual connection. An icon is or embodies a possibility, insofar as its object need not actually exist. A photograph is regarded as an icon because of its resemblance to its object, but is regarded as an index (with icon attached) because of its actual connection to its object. Likewise, with a portrait painted from life. An icon's resemblance is objective and independent of interpretation, but is relative to some mode of apprehension such as sight. An icon need not be sensory; anything can serve as an icon, for example a streamlined argument (itself a complex symbol) is often used as an icon for an argument (another symbol) bristling with particulars.

Index

Peirce explains that an index is a sign that compels attention through a connection of fact, often through cause and effect. For example, if we see smoke we conclude that it is the effect of a cause – fire. It is an index if the connection is factual regardless of resemblance or interpretation. Peirce usually considered personal names and demonstratives such as the word "this" to be indices, for although as words they depend on interpretation, they are indices in depending on the requisite factual relation to their individual objects. A personal name has an actual historical connection, often recorded on a birth certificate, to its named object; the word "this" is like the pointing of a finger.

Symbol

Peirce treats symbols as habits or norms of reference and meaning. Symbols can be natural, cultural, or abstract and logical. They depend as signs on how they will be interpreted, and lack or have lost dependence on resemblance and actual, indexical connection to their represented objects, though the symbol's individual embodiment is an index to your experience of its represented object. Symbols are instantiated by specialized indexical sinsigns. A proposition, considered apart from its expression in a particular language, is already a symbol, but many symbols draw from what is socially accepted and culturally agreed upon. Conventional symbols such as "horse" and caballo, which prescribe qualities of sound or appearance for their instances (for example, individual instances of the word "horse" on the page) are based on what amounts to arbitrary stipulation. Such a symbol uses what is already known and accepted within our society to give meaning. This can be both in spoken and written language.

For example, we can call a large metal object with four wheels, four doors, an engine and seats a "car" because such a term is agreed upon within our culture and it allows us to communicate. In much the same way, as a society with a common set of understandings regarding language and signs, we can also write the word "car" and in the context of Australia and other English speaking nations, know what it symbolises and is trying to represent.

== Saussure and representation ==
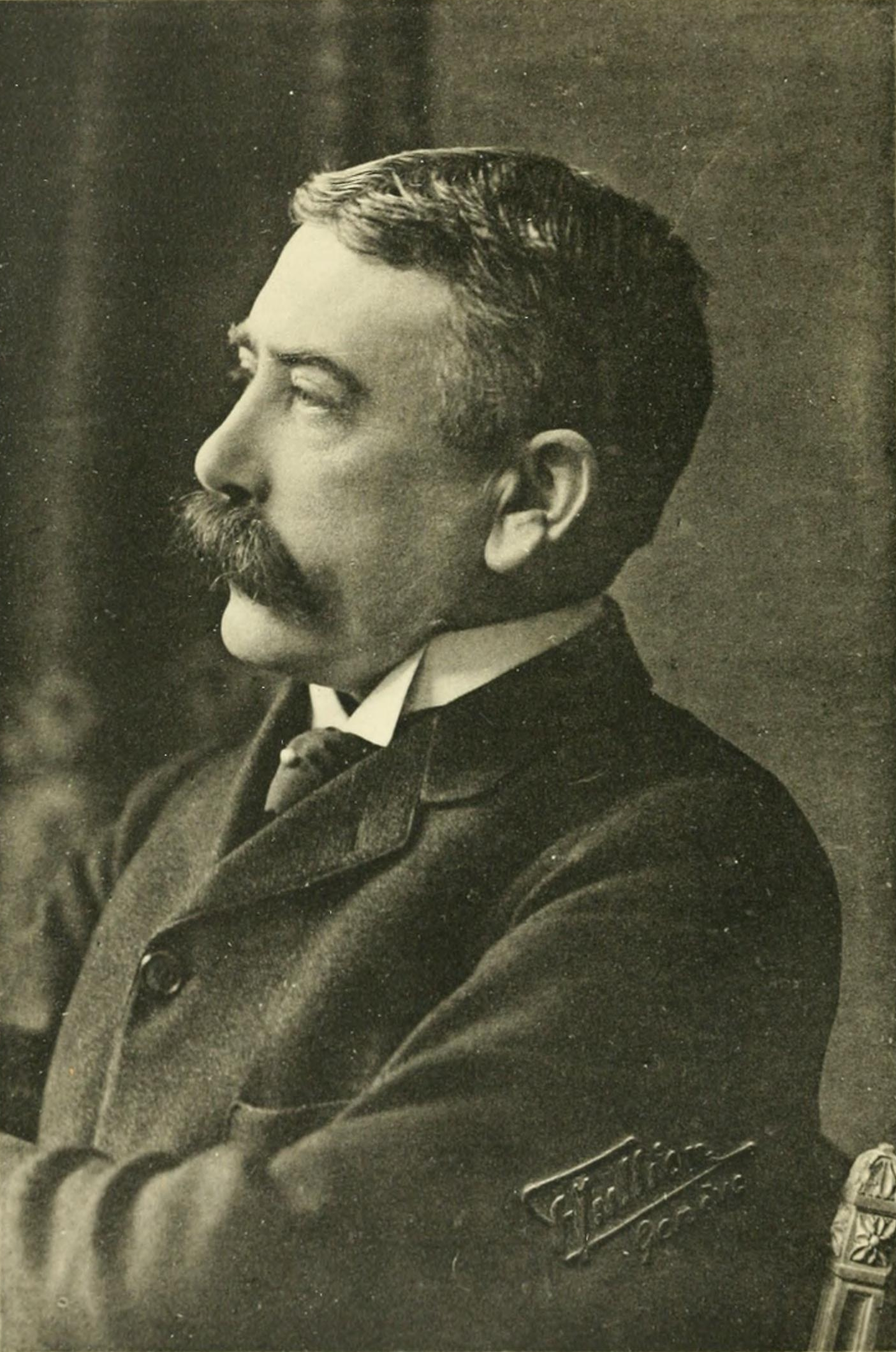
Ferdinand de Saussure

Swiss linguist Ferdinand de Saussure (1857–1913) played a major role in the development of semiotics with his argument that language is a system of signs that needs to be understood in order to fully understand the process of linguistics. The study of semiotics examines the signs and types of representation that humans use to express feelings, ideas, thoughts and ideologies. Although semiotics is often used in the form of textual analysis it also involves the study of representation and the processes involved with representation.

The process of representation is characterised by using signs that we recall mentally or phonetically to comprehend the world. Saussure says before a human can use the word "tree" she or he has to envision the mental concept of a tree.

Two things are fundamental to the study of signs:

1. The signified: a mental concept, and
2. The signifier: the verbal manifestation, the sequence of letters or sounds, the linguistic realisation.

The signifier is the word or sound; the signified is the representation.

Saussure points out that signs:

- Are arbitrary: There is no link between the signifier and the signified
- Are relational: We understand we take on meaning in relation to other words. Such as we understand "up" in relation to "down" or a dog in relation to other animals, such as a cat.
- constitute our world – "You cannot get outside of language. We exist inside a system of signs".

Saussure suggests that the meaning of a sign is arbitrary, in effect; there is no link between the signifier and the signified. The signifier is the word or the sound of the word and the signified is the representation of the word or sound. For example, when referring to the term "sister" (signifier) a person from an English speaking country such as Australia, may associate that term as representing someone in their family who is female and born to the same parents (signified). An Aboriginal Australian may associate the term "sister" to represent a close friend that they have a bond with. This means that the representation of a signifier depends completely upon a person's cultural, linguistic and social background.

Saussure argues that if words or sounds were simply labels for existing things in the world, translation from one language or culture to another would be easy, it is the fact that this can be extremely difficult that suggests that words trigger a representation of an object or thought depending on the person that is representing the signifier. The signified triggered from the representation of a signifier in one particular language do not necessarily represent the same signified in another language. Even within one particular language many words refer to the same thing but represent different people's interpretations of it. A person may refer to a particular place as their "work" whereas someone else represents the same signifier as their "favorite restaurant". This can also be subject to historical changes in both the signifier and the way objects are signified.

Saussure claims that an imperative function of all written languages and alphabetic systems is to "represent" spoken language. Most languages do not have writing systems that represent the phonemic sounds they make. For example, in English the written letter "a" represents different phonetic sounds depending on which word it is written in. The letter "a" has a different sound in the word in each of the following words, "apple", "gate", "margarine" and "beat", therefore, how is a person unaware of the phonemic sounds, able to pronounce the word properly by simply looking at alphabetic spelling. The way the word is represented on paper is not always the way the word would be represented phonetically. This leads to common misrepresentations of the phonemic sounds of speech and suggests that the writing system does not properly represent the true nature of the pronunciation of words.

== See also ==
- Aspectism
- Conceptual art
- Cultural artifact
- Culture theory
- Figurative art
- Media influence
- Mimesis
- Painting
- Program music
- Realism (arts)
- Representative realism
- Social representation
- Symbol
- Western painting
- Work of art
