= Unnatural =

Unnatural or The Unnatural(s) may refer to:

== Film ==
- Alraune (1952 film), also known as Unnatural, a West German science fiction horror film
- The Unnaturals, a 1969 Italian-West German gothic horror film directed and written by Antonio Margheriti.
- Unnatural, a 2015 American horror film

== Television ==
- The Unnaturals (TV show), a sketch comedy program that aired between 1989 and 1991 on HA! and later CTV, the channels that later became Comedy Central
- "The Unnaturals" (Ben 10 episode), an episode of a TV series Ben 10
- "The Unnatural" (Bob's Burgers), a 2013 episode of the American sitcom Bob's Burgers
- "The Unnatural" (Frasier), a 1997 episode of the American sitcom Frasier
- "The Unnatural" (The X-Files), a 1999 episode of the American drama The X-Files
- "The Unnatural", a 1990 episode of American sitcom Married... with Children
- Unnatural (TV series), a 2018 Japanese drama television series

== See also ==
- Natural (disambiguation)
- Unnatural Acts (disambiguation)
