= Nature (disambiguation) =

Nature, in the broadest sense, is the natural, physical, or material world or universe.

Nature may also refer to:

== Specialized perspectives ==
- Nature (philosophy), in philosophy
- Nature (Christianity), in Christian theology
- Natural environment, the ecological sphere of life on Earth

== Arts and media ==
=== Music ===
- Nature (group), a K-Pop girl group formed in 2018
- Nature (rapper), Jermain Baxter (born 1972), American rapper
- Nature (The Mutton Birds album), 1995
- Nature (Paul Kelly album), 2018
- Nature: The Essence Part Three, an album by Ahmad Jamal, 1998
- "Nature" (song), by the Fourmyula, 1969; covered by the Mutton Birds, 1992
- "Nature", a song by Lu Han, 2019

=== Periodicals and literature ===
- Nature (journal), a British weekly scientific journal published since 1869
- La Nature, an 1873–1972 French magazine aimed at the popularization of science
- Nature Magazine, a 1923–1959 magazine published by the American Nature Association
- "Nature" (essay), an 1836 essay and collection of essays by Ralph Waldo Emerson
- "Nature", one of the essays in Mill's 1874 book Three Essays on Religion
- "Nature" (Tobler essay), a 1783 essay by Georg Christoph Tobler

=== Radio and television ===
- Nature (radio programme), a British wildlife and environmental programme
- Nature (TV program), an American wildlife documentary series since 1982

== Other uses ==
- Nature, another name for the wine grape Gewürztraminer

== See also ==
- Mother Nature, the personification of nature as a maternal figure
- Springer Nature, a German-British academic publishing company
- The Nature Company, American retail store chain
- Natural (disambiguation)
- Naturalism (disambiguation)
