= Naturism (disambiguation) =

Naturism is a lifestyle and cultural movement advocating social nudity.

Naturism may also refer to:

- Naturalism (philosophy), the idea that only natural laws operate in the universe (see also Metaphysical naturalism)
- Nature worship, the religious and devotional practices that focus on natural phenomena
- Naturism (literary movement), a late 19th-century French literary movement

== See also ==
- Naturalism (disambiguation)
