= Mr. Natural =

Mr. Natural may refer to:

- Mr. Natural (Stanley Turrentine album), 1964
- Mr. Natural (character), a Robert Crumb comic book character, first appearing in 1967
- Mr. Natural (Bee Gees album), 1974
  - "Mr. Natural" (song), a 1974 song by The Bee Gees from that album

== See also ==
- Mr. B Natural, a 1950s short film and its title character, spoofed by Mystery Science Theater 3000
