= Lu Han discography =

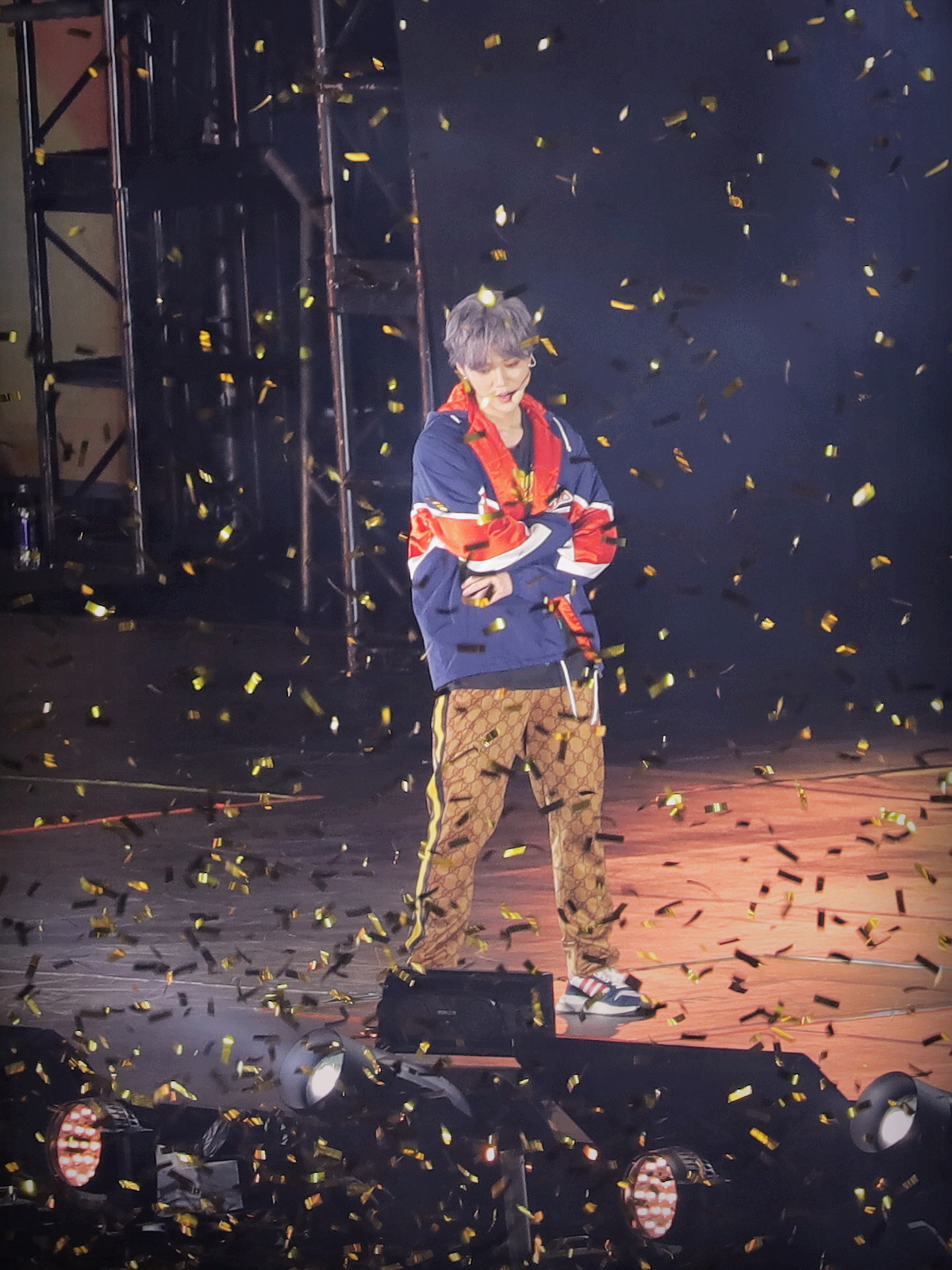
- Lu Han performing at Hangzhou in 2018
- Studio albums: 3
- EPs: 3
- Live albums: 4
- Singles: 32
- Single albums: 10
- Soundtrack appearance: 10

The discography of Chinese singer Lu Han consists of three studio albums, three extended plays, four live albums, one compilation album, ten single albums and thirty two singles.

== Albums ==
=== Studio albums ===
Title	Details	Peak	Sales
Title	Details	YinYueTai Mainland Album Chart	Sales
Reloaded	Released: December 22, 2015; Label: LuHan Studio; Formats: CD, digital download, streaming audio; Track listing: 1. 有点儿意思 (That Good Good); 2. 超级冠军 (Football Gang); 3. 诺言 (Promises); 4. 致爱 (Your Song); 5. 勋章 (Medals); 6. 海底 (Deep); 7. 冒险时间 (Adventure Time); 8. Lu; 9. 有点儿意思 (That Good Good Penthouse Penthouse Remix)); 10. 有点儿意思 (That Good Good (Squareloud Remix))	1	CHN: 73,500+
XXVII+	Released: September 21, 2017; Label: LuHan Studio; Formats: CD, digital download, streaming audio; Track listing: 1. 某时某刻(Live) (Catch Me When I Fall); 2. 微白城市 (Winter Song); 3. Skin To Skin; 4. 敢 (Roleplay); 5. 如果 (What If I Said); 6. 时差 (On Call); 7. 夜行记 (Say It); 8. 触发 (Set It Off); 9. 零界點 (On Fire); 10. 心率 (Like A Dream)	78	CHN: 11,000+
π: Ready To Play?	Released: March 19, 2021; Label: LuHan Studio; Formats: Floppy disk (Limited edition); Track listing Disk 1 (Audio): 1. 体会 Nature; 2. 剧中人 Imitation; 3. 夜的尽头 Ready; 4. 夏令时 Your Love; 5. Walking on the Moon; 6. Dream Up; 7. 鹿晗 Slow Motion; 8. 咖啡 (Coffee) 8O's Remix; 9. 别来烦我 Don't Bother; 10. 敏感 Sensitive-AM; 11. 敏感 Sensitive-PM; 12. 原色 True Colour; 13. 鹿晗 Slow Motion-Acoustic; Disk 2 (Music Videos): 1. 体会 Nature; 2. 夜的尽头 Ready; 3. Walking on the Moon; 4. Dream Up; 5. 别来烦我 Don't Bother	Unavailable	CHN: 30,000+

=== Live albums ===
Title	Details
Luhan Restarts Tour Concert	Released: November 7, 2017; Label: LuHan Studio; Formats: digital download, streaming audio
RE: X Tour Concert	Released: December 21, 2018; Label: LuHan Studio; Formats: digital download, streaming audio
Long Time No See, Come Out And Talk	Released: November 24, 2022; Label: LuHan Studio; Formats: Vinyl, digital download, streaming audio; Track listing: 1. 心率(Live) (Like A Dream); 2. 夜的尽头(Live) (Ready); 3. 路口(Live)*实体独家收录 (Live); 4. 爱,很简单(Live) (I Love You); 5. 某时某刻(Live) (Catch Me When I Fall); 6. 小镇姑娘(with 王勉) (Live) (Small Town Girl); 7. 寂寞的季节(with 高瀚宇) (Season Of Loneliness); 8. 橘子汽水(with 高苏尧) (Live) (Orange Soda); 9. 像我这样的人(with 毛不易) (Someone Like Me); 10. 天黑黑(Live) (The Dark Day)
2023 πday Concert Live	Released: May 9, 2024; Label: LuHan Studio; Formats: Vinyl, USB; Track listing SIDE A: 1. 这就是我 (Dream up); 2. Walking On The Moon; 3. 有点儿意思 (That Good Good); 4. 夜行记 (Say it); 5. 时间停了 (The Moment); SIDE B: 1. 敏感 (Sensitive-AM); 2. Slow Ride (兜风); 3. 梦麻之地; 4. Your Love (夏令时); 5. 原色 (True Colour); SIDE C: 1. 剧中人 (Imitation); 2. 敢 (Roleplay) + Lu (TroyBoi Remix); 3. 風 (Deep); 4. 零界点 (On fire); 5. 再见; SIDE D: 1. 超级冠军 (Football Gang); 2. 心率 (Like a Dream); 3. 我们的明天 (Our Tomorrow); 4. 勋章 (Medals); 5. 让我留在你身边 (Let Me Stay By Your Side)

=== Compilation albums ===
Title	Details
LuHan 10th Anniversary Album	Released: December 27, 2021; Label: LuHan Studio; Formats: Vinyl; Track listing: 1. Our Tomorrow; 2. Your song 3. Medals; 4. Catch me when I fall 5. On call 6. The Moment; 7. Imitation; 8. Dream up 9. True Colour; 10. Gone with the Wind

=== Single albums ===
Title	Details	Sales
Reloaded II	Released: December 1, 2015; Label: LuHan Studio; Formats: digital download, streaming audio; Track listing: 1. 海底 (Deep); 2. Lu	CHN: 1,320,000+
Xperience	Released: October 21, 2016; Label: LuHan Studio; Formats: digital download, streaming audio; Track listing: 1. 某时某刻 (Catch Me When I Fall); 2. 某时某刻 (Catch Me When I Fall) (Inst.)	—N/a
Xplore	Released: December 27, 2016; Label: LuHan Studio; Formats: digital download, streaming audio; Track listing: 1. 微白城市 (Winter Song); 2. Skin To Skin	CHN: 3,700,000+
Venture	Released: February 21, 2017; Label: LuHan Studio; Formats: digital download, streaming audio; Track listing: 1. 如果 (What If I Said); 2. 敢 (Roleplay)	CHN: 2,600,000+
Imagination	Released: April 17, 2017; Label: LuHan Studio; Formats: digital download, streaming audio; Track listing: 1. 时差 (On Call); 2. 夜行记 (Say it)	CHN: 1,850,000+
I	Released: June 27, 2017; Label: LuHan Studio; Formats: digital download, streaming audio; Track listing: 1. Set it Off; 2. On Fire	CHN: 2,430,000+
π-volume.1	Released: April 17, 2019; Label: LuHan Studio; Formats: digital download, streaming audio; Track listing: 1. Imitation (剧中人); 2. Nature (体会)	CHN: 3,480,000+
π-volume.2	Released: August 30, 2019; Label: LuHan Studio; Formats: digital download, streaming audio; Track listing: 1. Ready (夜的尽头); 2. Your Love (夏令时); 3. Walking On the Moon	CHN: 1,320,000+
π-volume.3	Released: May 27, 2020; Label: LuHan Studio; Formats: digital download, streaming audio; Track listing: 1. Slow Motion (慢慢); 2. Coffee (咖啡) (80s Remix)	CHN: 3,010,000+
π-volume.4	Released: October 27, 2020; Label: LuHan Studio; Formats: digital download, streaming audio; Track listing: 1. Don't Bother (别来烦我); 2. Sensitive (敏感) (AM Version); 3. Sensitive (敏感) (PM Version); 4. True Colors (原色)	CHN: 1,511,000+

== Extended plays ==
Title	Details	Sales
Reloaded I	Released: September 14, 2015; Label: LuHan Studio; Formats: digital download, streaming audio; Track listing: 1. 《有点儿意思》（That Good Good）; 2. 《冒险时间》（Adventure Time）; 3. 《有点儿意思》（That Good Good Penthouse Penthouse Remix）; 4. 《有点儿意思》（That Good Good Squareloud Remix）; 5. 《有点儿意思》（That Good Good Instrumental Version）	CHN: 3,359,000+
Reloaded+	Released: February 16, 2016; Label: LuHan Studio; Formats: digital download, streaming audio; Track listing: 1. 封印 (Excited); 2. 原动力 (The Inner Force) (Original Mix版); 3. 致爱 (Your Song) (吉他版)	CHN: 1,430,000+
Re-play	Released: July 5, 2018; Label: LuHan Studio; Formats: digital download, streaming audio; Track listing: 1. Football Gang (remix) [ft. Fabian Mazur]; 2. Skin To Skin (remmix) [ft. Machinedrum]; 3. Lu (Tryoboy remix); 4. Catch Me When I Fall (remix) [ft. R3HAB]	—N/a
Seasons	Released: June 13, 2025; Label: LuHan Studio; Formats: digital download, streaming audio, Vinyl Track listing: 1. My Sugar (我的糖); 2. Stars With You (和你看星星); 3. 四季 (Four Seasons); 4. My Sugar (Instrumental) (Vinyl Exclusive)	CHN: 480,000

== Singles ==
=== As lead artist ===
Title	Year	Peak chart positions			Sales	Album
Title	Year	Billboard China		CHN TME UNI (Note: The China TME UNI Chart was launched by Tencent Music in 2018 and first published by Billboard in November 2022.)	Sales	Album
Title	Year	V Chart	Top 100	CHN TME UNI	Sales	Album
"That Good Good"	2015	—	Unavailable	Unavailable	Unavailable	Reloaded I
"Your Song"	2015	—	Unavailable	Unavailable	Unavailable	Reloaded
"Football Gang"	2015	—	Unavailable	Unavailable	Unavailable	Reloaded
"Medals"	2015	1	Unavailable	Unavailable	Unavailable	Reloaded
"Promises"	2015	—	Unavailable	Unavailable	Unavailable	Reloaded
"Lu"	2015	—	Unavailable	Unavailable	Unavailable	Reloaded II
"Excited"	2016	1	Unavailable	Unavailable	Unavailable	Reloaded+
"Catch Me When I Fall"	2016	2	Unavailable	Unavailable	Unavailable	Xperience
"Winter Song"	2016	3	Unavailable	Unavailable	Unavailable	Xplore
"Skin To Skin"	2016	3	Unavailable	Unavailable	Unavailable	Xplore
"What If I Said"	2017	1	Unavailable	Unavailable	Unavailable	Venture
"Roleplay" (Dance Ver.)	2017	1	Unavailable	Unavailable	Unavailable	Venture
"Roleplay"	2017	2	Unavailable	Unavailable	Unavailable	Venture
"On Call"	2017	3	Unavailable	Unavailable	Unavailable	Imagination
"Set It Off"	2017	1	Unavailable	Unavailable	Unavailable	I
"On Fire"	2017	3	Unavailable	Unavailable	Unavailable	I
"Time Stopped" (时间停了)	2018	2	Unavailable	3	Unavailable	Non-album single
"Nature" (体会)	2019	Unavailable	1	1	Unavailable	π-volume.1/π: Ready To Play?
"Ready" (夜的尽头)	2019	Unavailable	Unavailable	2	Unavailable	π-volume.2/π: Ready To Play?
"Dream Up" (这就是我)	2020	Unavailable	Unavailable	6	Unavailable	π: Ready To Play?
"Slow Motion (慢慢)"	2020	Unavailable	Unavailable	4	Unavailable	π-volume.3/π: Ready To Play?
"Gone With the Wind" (风吹过)	2021	Unavailable	Unavailable	5	CHN: 1,990,000+	LuHan 10th Anniversary Album
"Slow Ride" (兜风)	2022	Unavailable	Unavailable	2	CHN: 850,000+	2023 πday Concert Live
"Keep Me Alive"	2022	Unavailable	Unavailable	3	Unavailable	Non-album singles
"Crossing The Universe"	2023	Unavailable	Unavailable	–	Unavailable	Non-album singles
"P.XyZ (漂向宇宙尽头)"	2023	Unavailable	Unavailable	10	Unavailable	Non-album singles
"1.1"	2024	Unavailable	Unavailable	5	Unavailable	Non-album singles
"影子 (Shadow)"	2024	Unavailable	Unavailable	10	Unavailable	Non-album singles
"Dream All Summer (夏夜)"	2024	Unavailable	Unavailable	14	Unavailable	Non-album singles
"That's Right"	2024	Unavailable	Unavailable	34	Unavailable	Non-album singles
"往往 (Wang Wang)"	2024	Unavailable	Unavailable	22	Unavailable	Non-album singles
"Fill Me In Love"	2024	Unavailable	Unavailable	6	Unavailable	Non-album singles
"—" denotes releases that did not chart or were not released in that region.

=== Soundtrack appearances ===
Title	Year	Peak chart positions		Album
Title	Year	CHN Baidu Chart	CHN Billboard V Chart	Album
"Dear My Family" (as part of SM Town)	2012	—	—	I AM. OST
"Our Tomorrow"	2014	1	—	20 Once Again OST
"Love moving Forward"	2015	—	—	20 Once Again OST
"Sweet Honey"	2015	—	—	Comrades: Almost A Love Story OST
"Medals"	2015	—	5	The Witness OST
"Deep"	2015	—	3	Kung Fu Panda 3 OST
"The Inner Force"	2016	—	2	Star Wars: The Force Awakens OST
"Back to 17" (with Back to School 2 cast)	2016	2	—	Back to School 2 OST
"Let Me By Your Side"	2016	—	3	See You Tomorrow OST
"Chasing Dream With Childlike Heart"	2017	Unavailable		Sky Hunter OST
"Dream Land"	2020	Unavailable		Crossfire OST
"The Ballad of Lian and Cheng"	2021	Unavailable		Heaven Official's Blessing OST
"—" denotes releases that did not chart or were not released in that region.

=== Collaborations ===
Title	Year	Album
"Please Come to the Great Wall to Ski" (with David Tao)	2015	Non-album release
"Coffee" (with Kris Wu)	2020	Non-album release
"Sensitive" (with Huang Zitao)	2020	Non-album release
"Lights" (with Huang Zitao)	2024	30's Club (Huang Zitao's EP)

=== Other appearances ===
Title	Year	Peak chart positions	Sales	Album
Title	Year	KOR Gaon Chart	Sales	Album
"Maxstep" (as part of Younique Unit)	2012	228	*KOR (DL): 15,420+	PYL Younique Volume 1
