= Unnatural Acts =

Unnatural Acts can refer to

- Unnatural act, a form of sexual behavior that is considered a punishable offense by law
- Unnatural Acts (radio series), a BBC radio comedy series
- Unnatural Acts (TV series), a 1998 television sketch comedy series
- Unnatural Acts of Intercourse, a working title of the Stephen King book Just After Sunset
