= Naturally =

Naturally may refer to:

== Music ==
=== Albums ===
- Naturally!, an album by Nat Adderley
- Naturally (Houston Person album)
- Naturally (J. J. Cale album)
- Naturally (John Pizzarelli album)
- Naturally (Sharon Jones album)
- Naturally (Three Dog Night album)

=== Songs ===
- "Naturally" (Deborah Gibson song)
- "Naturally" (Kalapana song)
- "Naturally" (Selena Gomez & the Scene song)
- "Naturally", a song by Ayumi Hamasaki from I Am... (Ayumi Hamasaki album)
- "Naturally", a song by Fat Mattress from Fat Mattress II
- "Naturally", a song by Heatwave from Current
- "Naturally", a song by Huey Lewis and the News from Fore!
- "Naturally", a song by Katy Hudson from her debut album Katy Hudson
- "Naturally", a song by Lime Cordiale from Permanent Vacation
- "Naturally", a song by Moka Only from In and of Itself
- "Naturally", a song by Raffi from Bananaphone

== TV series ==
- Naturally (TV series), 2019 South Korean TV series
