= Aspectism =

Art depicting outward appearances

Aspectism is a type of visual art which only attempts to represent outward appearances.
