= Naturalism =

Naturalism may refer to:

== Arts ==
- Realism
  - Naturalism (literature), a literary movement beginning in the late 19th century
  - Naturalism (theatre), a movement in European drama and theatre
  - Poetic naturalism, an approach of Sean M. Carroll

== Philosophy ==
- Naturalism (philosophy), the idea that only natural laws and forces operate in the universe
  - Humanistic naturalism, a branch of philosophical naturalism
  - Liberal naturalism, a heterodox form of philosophical naturalism
  - Metaphysical naturalism, a philosophical basis for science
  - Religious naturalism – combines a naturalist worldview with ideals associated with many religions
  - Spiritual naturalism – combines a naturalist approach with spiritual ways of looking at the world
  - Transcendental naturalism – combines a naturalist approach with the idea that human cognition is fundamentally incapable of solving certain philosophical problems
- Ethical naturalism, or moral naturalism
- Dialectical naturalism, a term coined by Murray Bookchin
- Political naturalism, a belief that there is a natural law
- School of Naturalists, a Chinese Warring States-era philosophy also known as the School of Yin-Yang

== Sciences ==
- Sociological naturalism, the view that the natural world and the social world are roughly identical
  - Critical naturalism, an idea of Roy Bhaskar
- Natural history, a domain of inquiry involving organisms
  - Naturalist, a person who studies natural history
- Naturalistic observation, a research methodology

== Horses ==
- Naturalism (horse) (1988–2018), a racehorse

== See also ==
- Naturalness (disambiguation)
- Naturism (disambiguation)
- Naturalistic fallacy, the mistake of inferring "ought" from "is"
