= Carl Hoppe =

American painter

Carl Thomas Hoppe
- Born: August 22, 1897; San Antonio, Bexar County, Texas
- Died: January 15, 1981 (aged 83)
- Education: José Arpa y Perea
- Known for: Painting

Carl Thomas Hoppe (August 22, 1897 – January 15, 1981) was a South Texas artist.

Hoppe was born to German immigrants August and Teresa Hoppe in San Antonio, Bexar County, Texas.

Hoppe's day job was salesman for Joske's Department Store in downtown San Antonio, from which he retired in the 1970s. He was an artist of local notability during his lifetime, from the early 1900s through the 1960s, and appreciation for his style and skills resurged in the late 20th and early 21st Century. He specialized in landscapes, in a somewhat impressionistic style, signed with a characteristic "C. Hoppe".

Hoppe began painting as a youth and later studied under José Arpa y Perea, exhibiting numerous paintings in the mid to late 1920s. Some of the exhibits were held at the Witte Museum in San Antonio by Arpa (Museum of Fine Arts of Seville) and his students. He knew many of the leading artists in the state, including Porfirio Salinas, Robert William Wood, and Arpa, and went on field trips with Julian Onderdonk.

Hoppe's paintings have been exhibited at the River Art Group's River Art Gallery in San Antonio, Texas, and in 1997 a Special Exhibit of his works was held at the Panhandle-Plains Historical Museum in Canyon, Texas.

Hoppe died January 15, 1981, in San Antonio, at age 83.
