= En plein air =

Act of painting outdoors

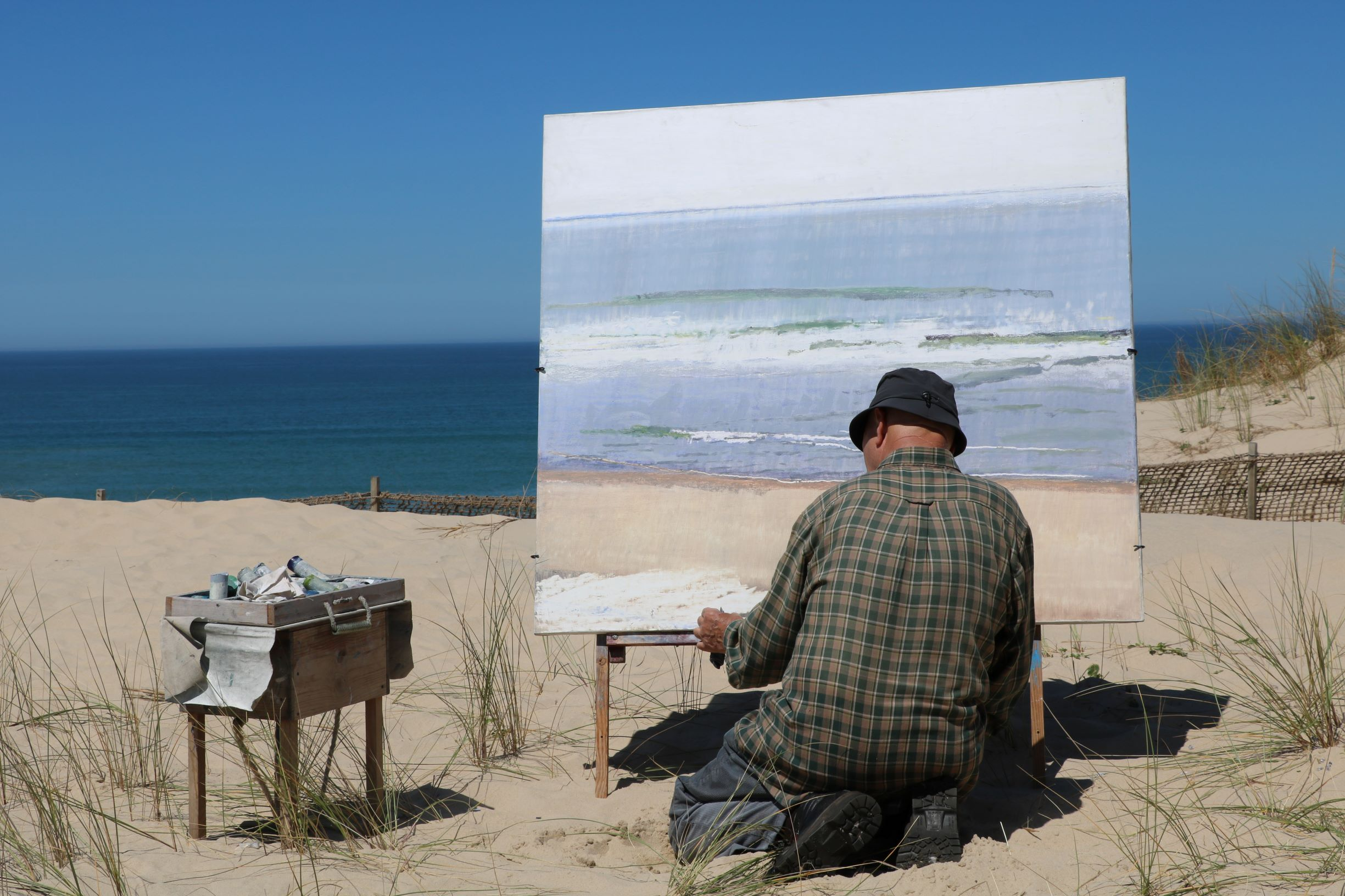
En plein air painter on the Côte d'Argent in Hourtin, France

En plein air (pronounced [ɑ̃ plɛ.n‿ɛʁ]; French for 'outdoors'), or plein-air painting, is the act of painting outdoors.

This method contrasts with studio painting or academic rules that might create a predetermined look. The theory of 'En plein air' painting is credited to Pierre-Henri de Valenciennes (1750–1819), first expounded in a treatise titled Reflections and Advice to a Student on Painting, Particularly on Landscape (1800), where he developed the concept of landscape portraiture by which the artist paints directly onto canvas in situ within the landscape.

It enabled the artist to better capture the changing details of weather and light. The invention of portable canvases and easels allowed the practice to develop, particularly in France, and in the early 1830s the Barbizon School of painting in natural light was highly influential.

Amongst the most prominent features of this school were its tonal qualities, colour, loose brushwork, and softness of form. These were variants that were particularly relevant to the mid 19th-century Hudson River School and to Impressionism.

== History ==
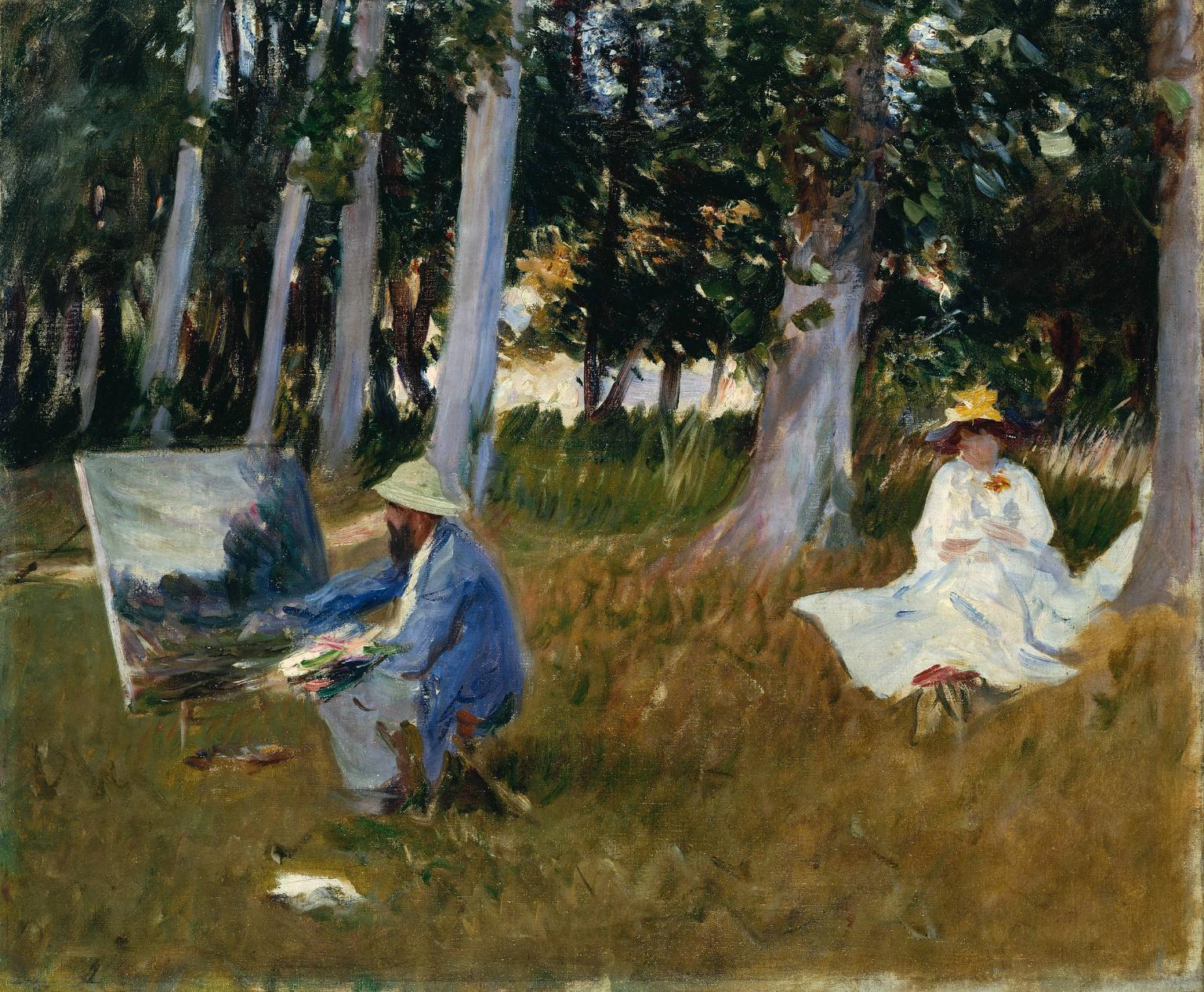
Claude Monet Painting by the Edge of a Wood (1885) by John Singer Sargent. Oil on canvas. 54.0 × 64.8 cm. Tate Gallery, London.

Before the 19th century, artists had mixed their own paints from raw pigments that they often ground themselves from a variety of media. This had made for inconvenient portability and kept most painting activities confined to the studio. However, in the 1830s, the Barbizon school in France that included Charles-François Daubigny and Théodore Rousseau used the practice of en plein air to depict the changing appearance of light accurately as weather conditions altered.

This situation improved later in the 1800s when tubes of oil paint became available, allowing En plein air painting to become viable for more artists. This was in part because of the invention of the collapsible paint tube in 1841 by American portraitist John G. Rand.

In the early 1860s, four young painters: Claude Monet, Pierre-Auguste Renoir, Alfred Sisley and Frédéric Bazille, met whilst studying under the academic artist Charles Gleyre. They discovered that they shared an interest in painting landscape and contemporary life, and they often ventured into the countryside together to paint in the open air. They discovered that they could paint in sunlight directly from nature, and making use of the vivid synthetic pigments that were available, they began to develop a lighter and brighter manner of painting that extended further the Realism of Gustave Courbet and the Barbizon school. It was radical practise at its inception, but by the later decades of the 19th century the theory had been absorbed into normal artistic practise.

There were artists' colonies across France, such as the one at Étaples on the Côte d'Opal that included landscape impressionists Eugène Chigot and Henri Le Sidaner. The latter artist specialised in translating nocturne light to canvas using oil and pastel.

The Macchiaioli were a group of Italian painters active in Tuscany in the second half of the nineteenth century, who, breaking with the antiquated conventions taught by the Italian academies of art, did much of their painting outdoors in order to capture natural light, shade, and colour. This practice relates the Macchiaioli to the French Impressionists who came to prominence a few years later, although the Macchiaioli pursued somewhat different purposes. Their movement began in Florence in the late 1850s.

In England the Newlyn School was also a major proponent of the technique in the latter 19th century. There were lesser known artist colonies practising, including a loose collective at Amberley in West Sussex centred around the Paris trained Edward Stott who produced atmospheric rural landscapes that were highly popular among some late Victorians.

The movement expanded to America, starting in California then moving to other American locales notable for their natural light qualities, including the Hudson River Valley in New York.

The act of outdoor painting from observation has been continually popular well into the 21st century.

== Equipment and challenges ==
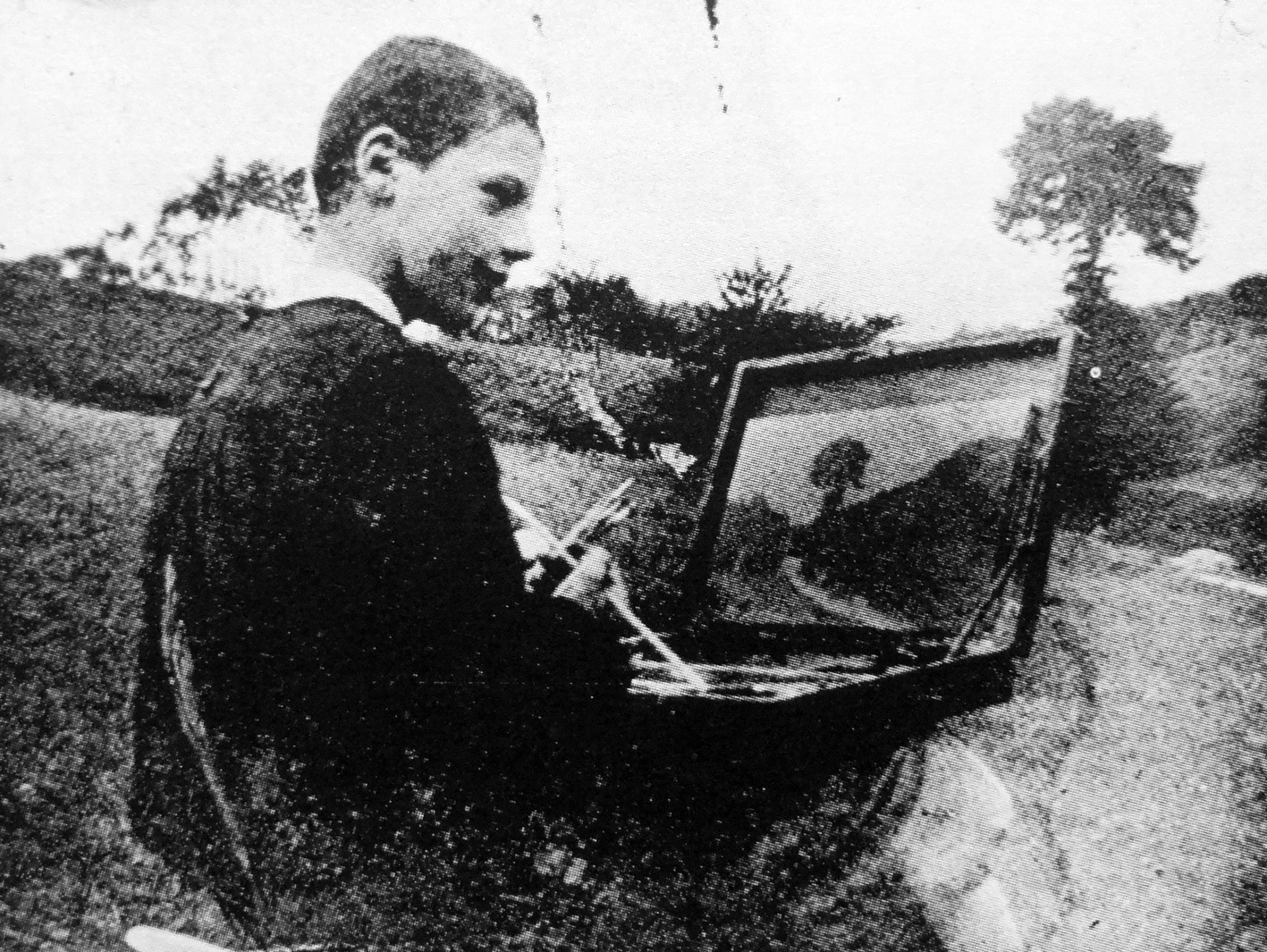
Robert Antoine Pinchon, 1898, painting Le chemin, oil on canvas, 22 × 32 cm

It was during the mid-19th century that the "box easel", typically known as the "French box easel" or "field easel", was invented. It is uncertain who developed it, but these highly portable easels with telescopic legs and built-in paint box and palette made it easier to go into the forest and up the hillsides. Still made today, they remain a popular choice (even for home use) since they fold up to the size of a briefcase and thus are easy to store.

The Pochade Box is a compact box that allows the artist to keep all their supplies and palette within the box and have the work on the inside of the lid. Some designs allow for a larger canvas which can be held by clamps built into the lid. There are designs which can also hold a few wet painting canvases or panels within the lid. These boxes have a rising popularity as while they are mainly used for plein air painting, they can also be used in the studio, home, or classroom. Since pochade boxes are mainly used for painting on location, the canvas or work surface may be small, usually not more than 20 inches (50 cm).

Challenges include the type of paint used to paint outdoors, animals, bugs, onlookers, rapidly shifting light as the sun or clouds move, and environmental conditions such as weather. Conditions include wind that can topple an easel, unpredictability such as rain, and temperature extremes that can affect the paint itself. Logistics also present a hurdle, as transporting equipment such as easels, palettes, and supplies to a location requires careful planning and a portable setup. Acrylic paint may harden and dry quickly in warm, sunny weather, and it cannot be reused. On the opposite side of the spectrum is the challenge of painting in moist or damp conditions with precipitation. The advent of plein air painting predated the invention of acrylics. The traditional and well-established method of painting en plein air incorporates the use of oil paint.

== Advocates ==
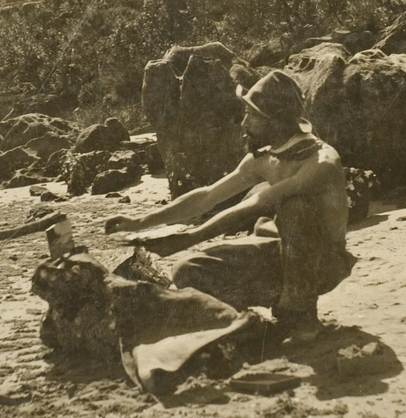
Australian impressionist Arthur Streeton painting en plein air, c. 1892

French impressionist painters such as Claude Monet, Camille Pissarro, Alfred Sisley, and Pierre-Auguste Renoir advocated plein air painting, and much of their work was done outdoors in the diffuse light of a large white umbrella. Claude Monet was an avid en plein air artist who deduced that to seize the closeness and likeness of an outside setting at a specific moment one had to be outside to do so rather than just paint an outside setting in their studio. In the second half of the 19th century and beginning of the 20th century in Russia, painters such as Vasily Polenov, Isaac Levitan, Valentin Serov, Konstantin Korovin and I. E. Grabar were known for painting en plein air.

In the late 19th century, plein air painting was not limited to the Old World. American impressionists too, such as those of the Old Lyme school, were avid painters en plein air. American impressionist painters noted for this style during this era included Guy Rose, Robert William Wood, Mary DeNeale Morgan, John Gamble, and Arthur Hill Gilbert. In Australia in the 1880s and 1890s, Arthur Streeton, Frederick McCubbin, Tom Roberts and other members of the Heidelberg School of Australian impressionism were also committed plein airists.

In Canada in the 1920s, the Group of Seven and Tom Thomson are examples of en plein air advocates. Canadian painter George Agnew Reid (1860–1947) was also very interested in plein air painting. As a teacher at the Ontario College of Art (now OCAD University), he instituted outdoor classes for his students. In his own painting practice, Reid's work took on plein air qualities, such as simplified forms, impressionist influence, and outdoor subject matter.

== Notable artists (selected) ==
- Frédéric Bazille
- Henri Biva
- Ralph Wallace Burton
- Mary Cassatt
- Jack Cassinetto
- William Merritt Chase
- Eugène Chigot
- Robert Clunie
- John Constable
- Lovis Corinth
- William Didier-Pouget
- Rackstraw Downes
- Carl Eytel
- Francesco Filippini
- David Gallup
- Arthur Hill Gilbert
- Vincent van Gogh
- I. E. Grabar
- George Hetzel
- Winslow Homer
- George Inness
- Konstantin Korovin
- Henri Le Sidaner
- Isaac Levitan
- Theodore Lukits
- The Macchiaioli
- Marvin Mangus
- Frederick McCubbin
- Stanisław Masłowski
- Willard Metcalf
- Claude Monet
- Berthe Morisot
- Edgar Payne
- Robert Antoine Pinchon
- Camille Pissarro
- William Preston Phelps
- Vasily Polenov
- Pierre-Auguste Renoir
- Tom Roberts
- Guy Rose
- John Singer Sargent
- Alex Schaefer
- Valentin Serov
- Alfred Sisley
- Matthew Smith
- Joaquín Sorolla
- Edward Stott
- Arthur Streeton
- Anthony Thieme
- Tom Thomson
- Henry Scott Tuke
- Andrew Winter
- Robert William Wood
- Mary Agnes Yerkes

== Images ==
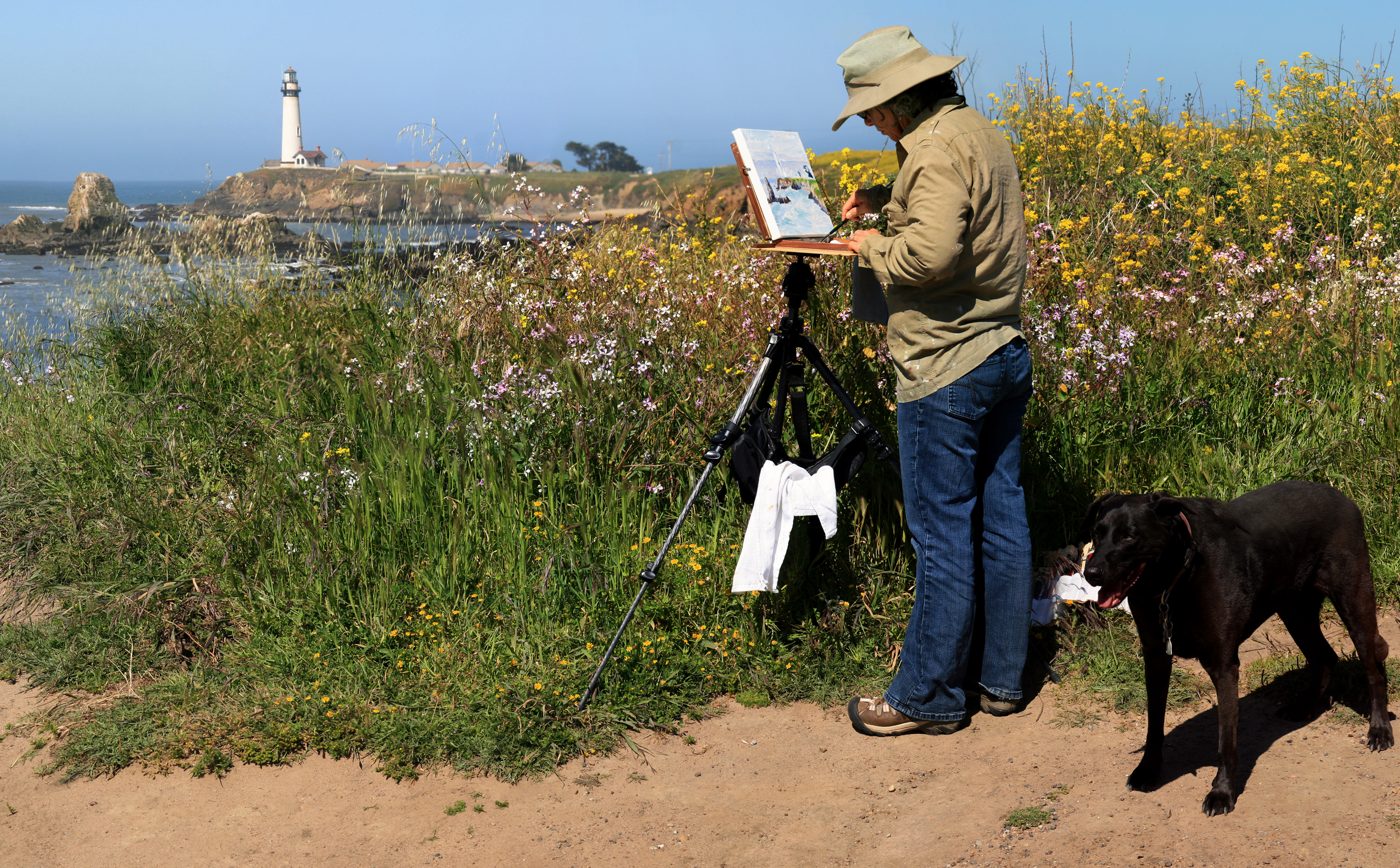
Artist working en plein air, using a Pochade box at Pigeon Point Lighthouse in California.

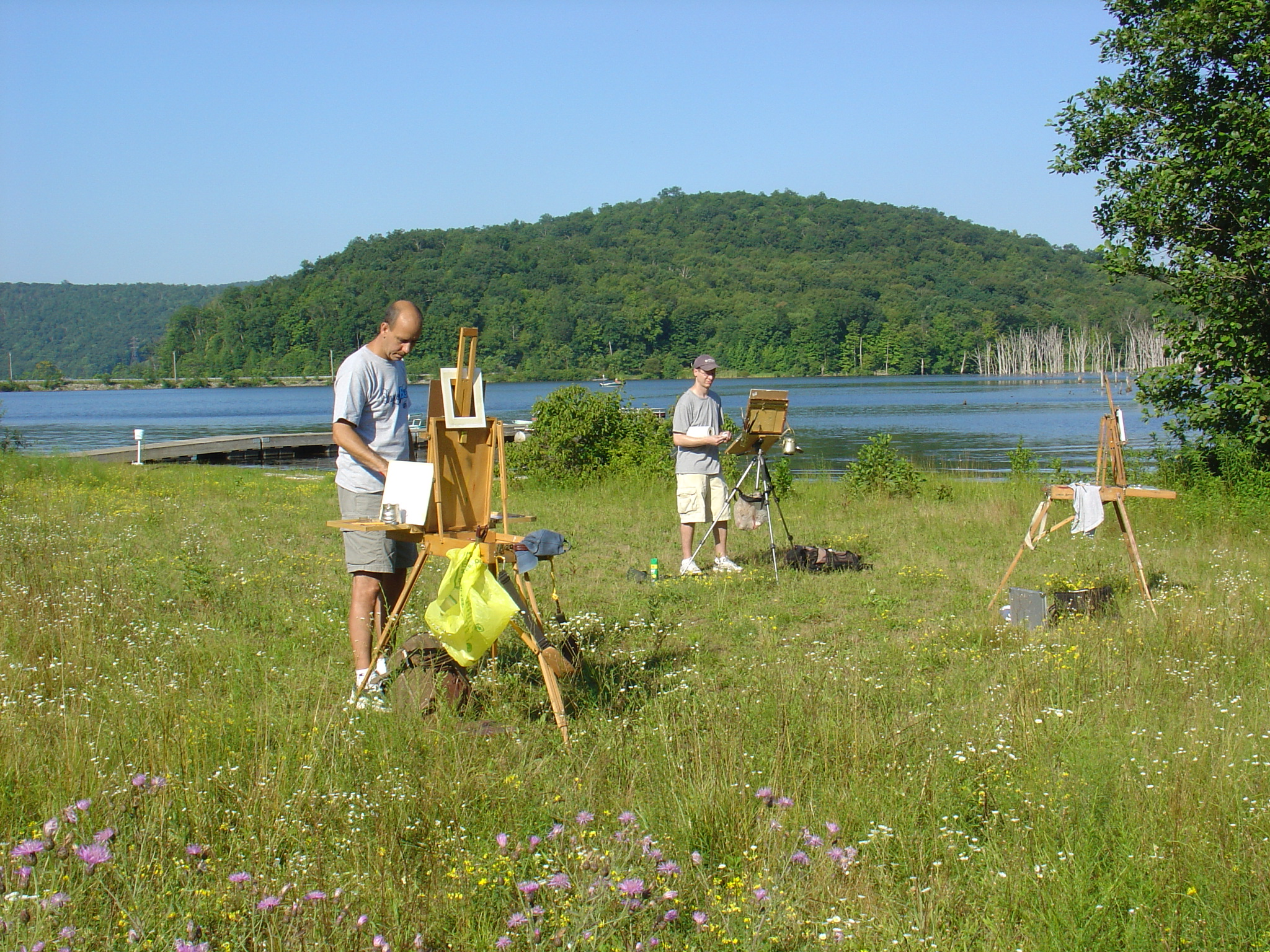
En plein air painters painting in Ringwood, New Jersey. Artists are using a French easel on the left of picture, and a Pochade box on the right.

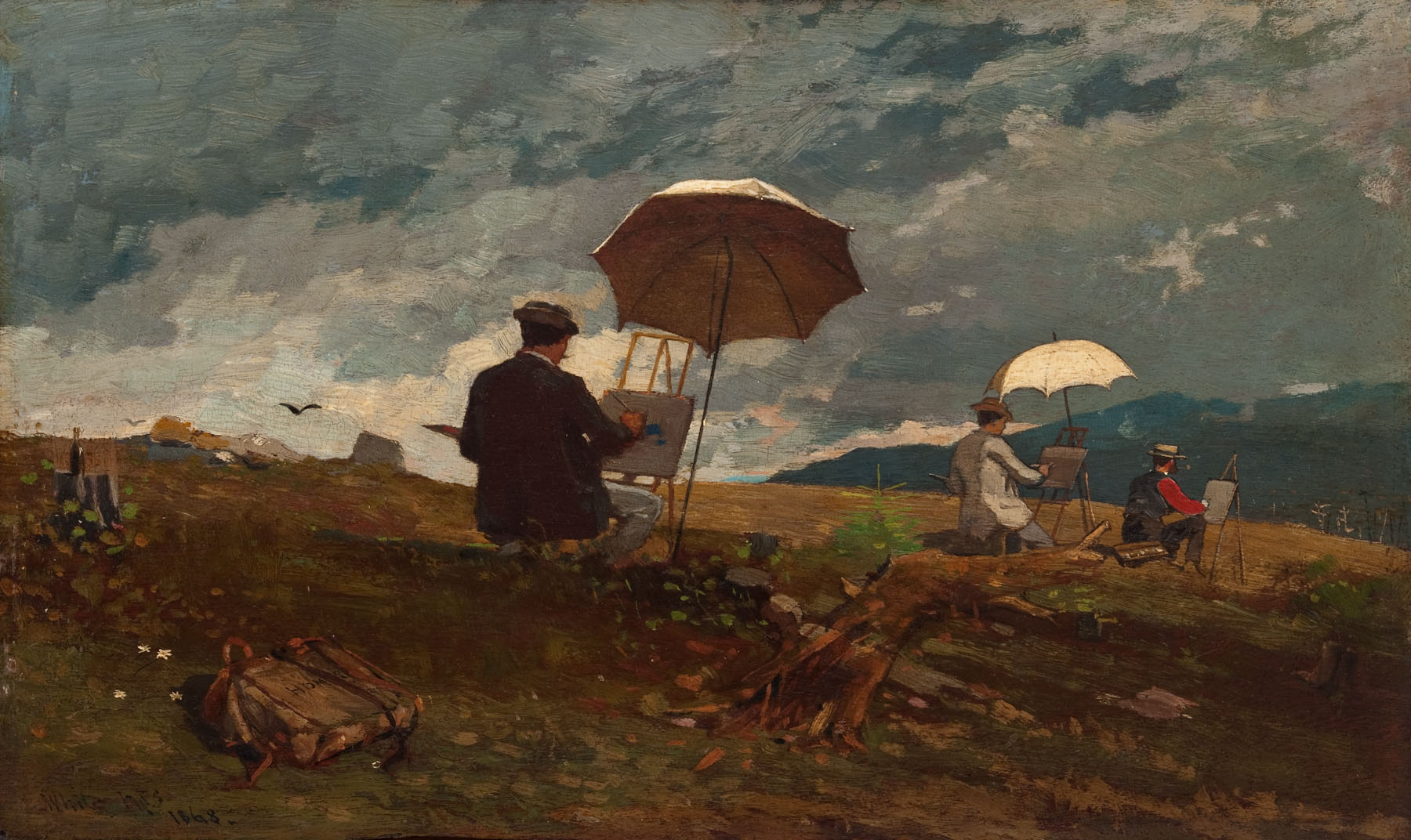
Winslow Homer, Artists Sketching in the White Mountains, 1868, oil on panel, 24.1 × 40.3 cm, Portland Museum of Art

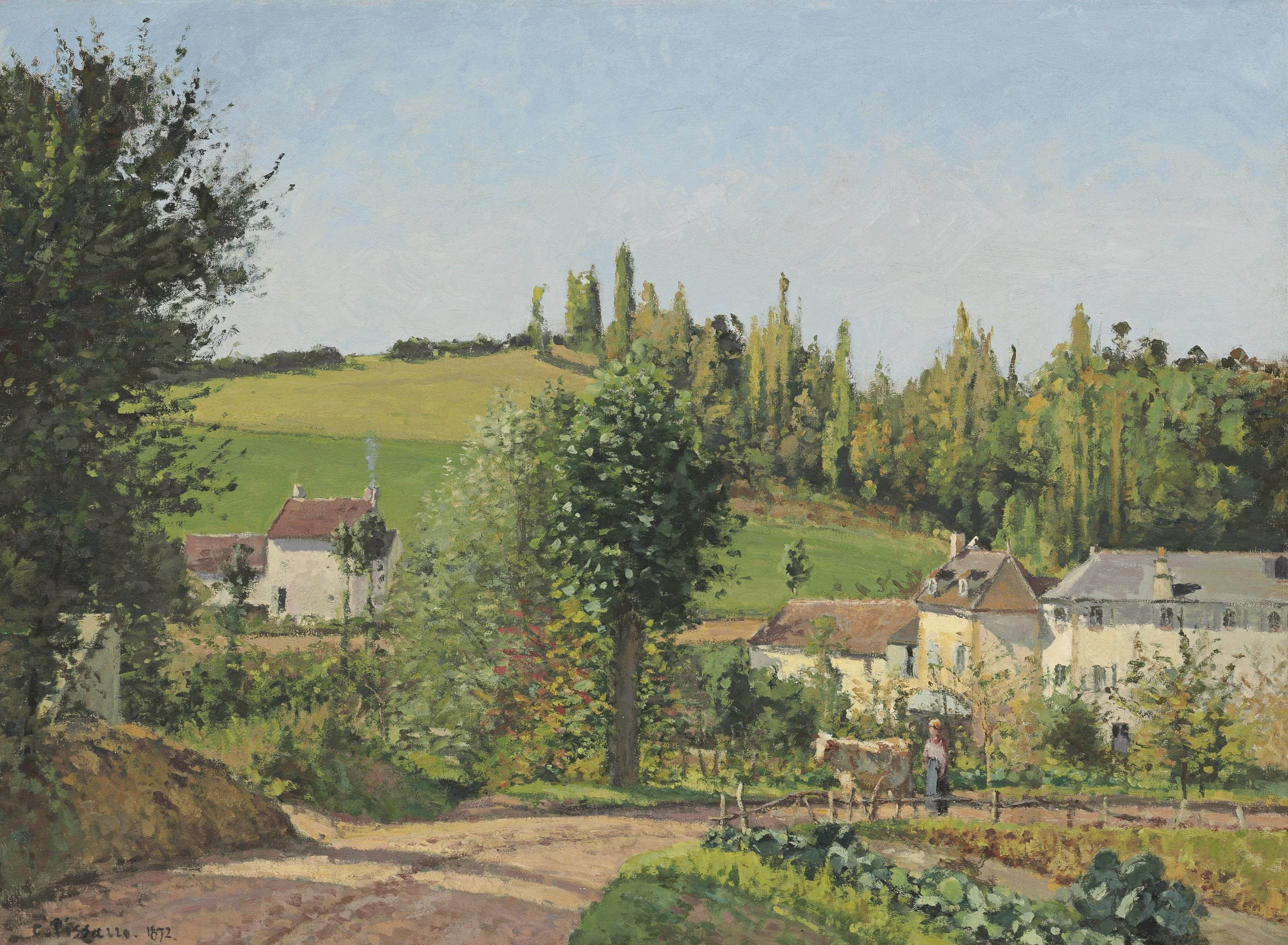
Camille Pissarro, 1872, Hameau aux environs de Pontoise, oil on canvas, 54 × 74 cm, private collection

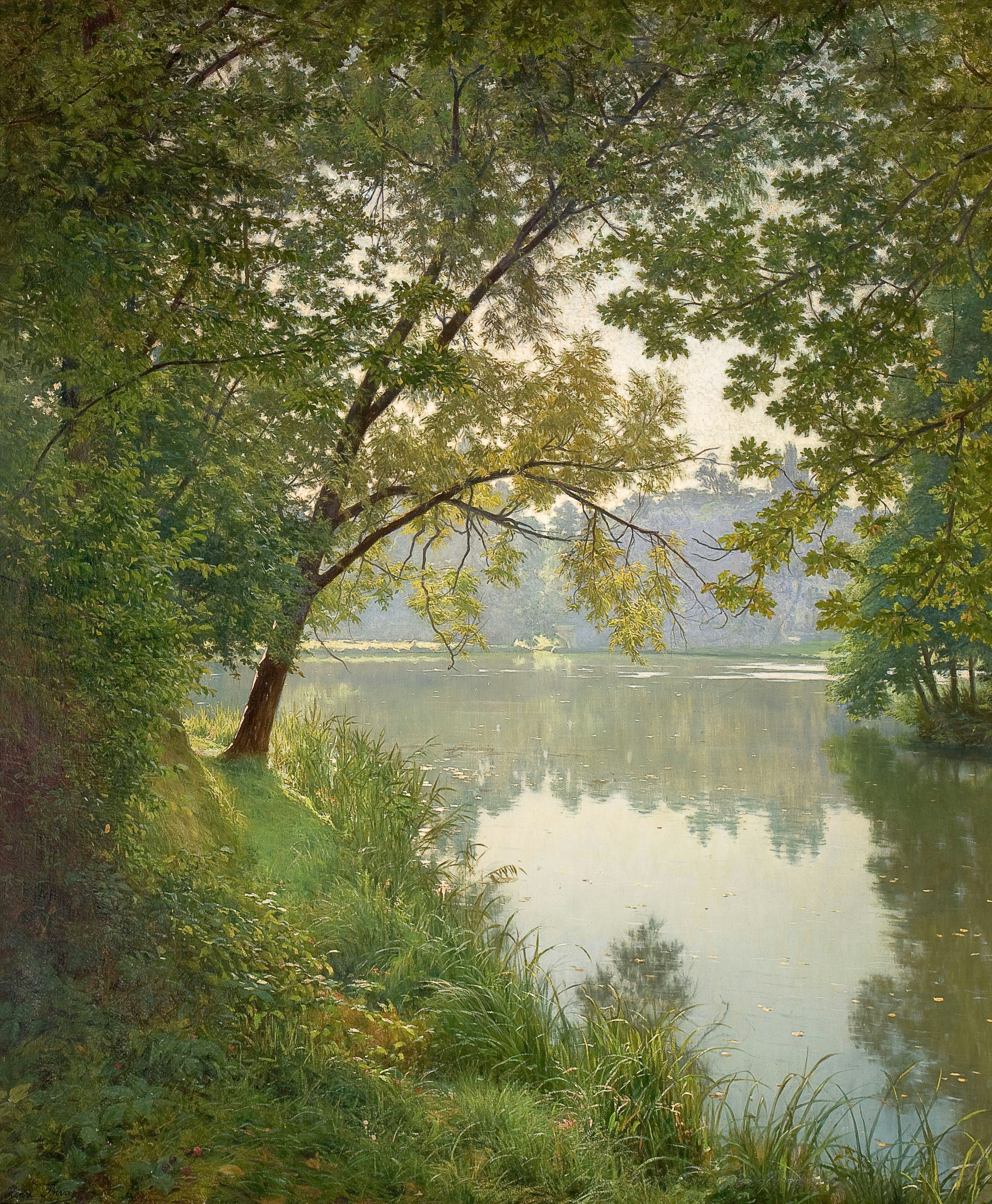
Henri Biva, c.1905–06, Matin à Villeneuve (From Waters Edge), oil on canvas, 151.1 × 125.1 cm

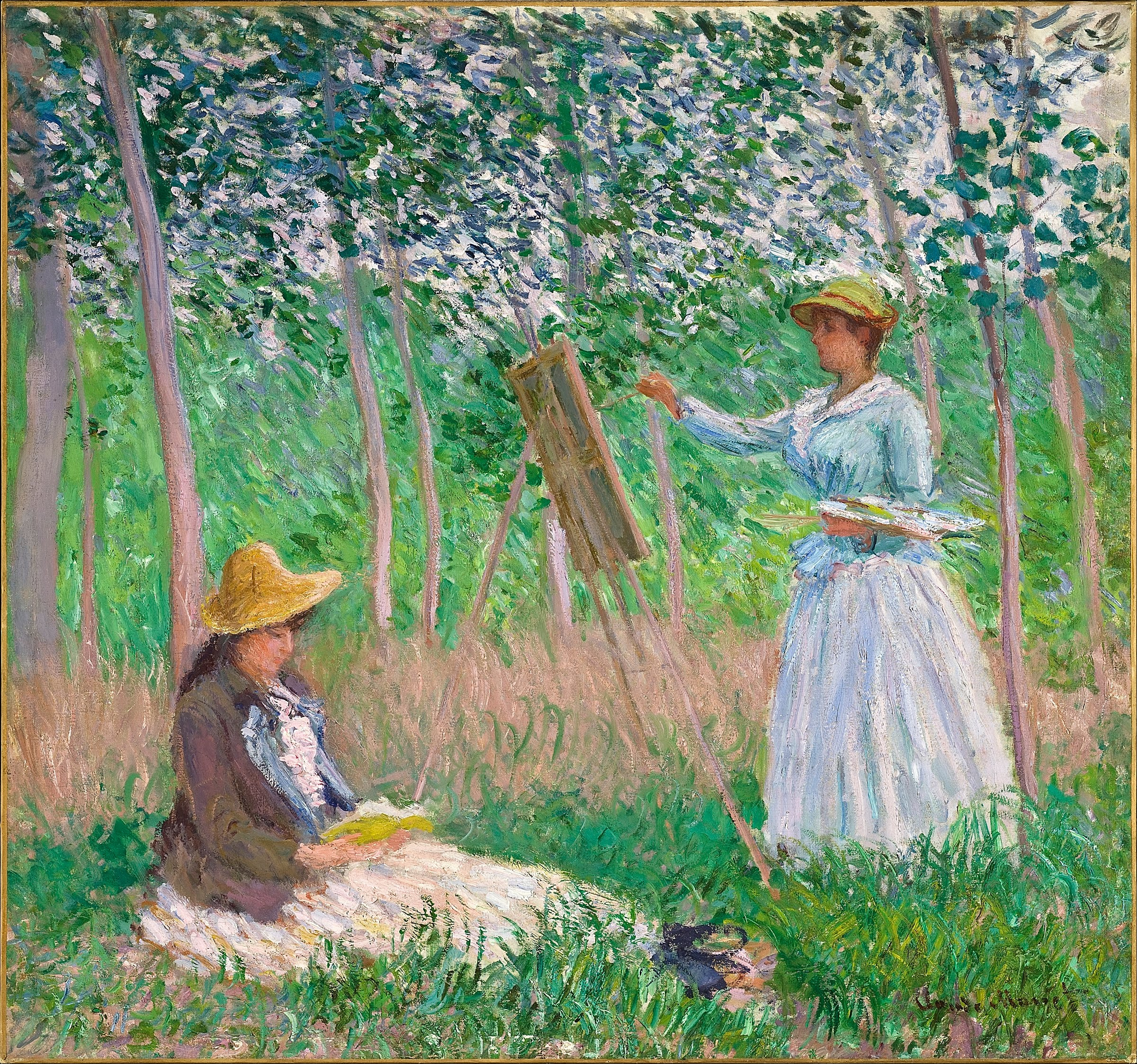
Claude Monet, 1887, In the Woods at Giverny, Blanche Hoschedé Monet at Her Easel with Suzanne Hoschedé Reading, oil on canvas, 91.4 x 97.7 cm, Los Angeles County Museum of Art

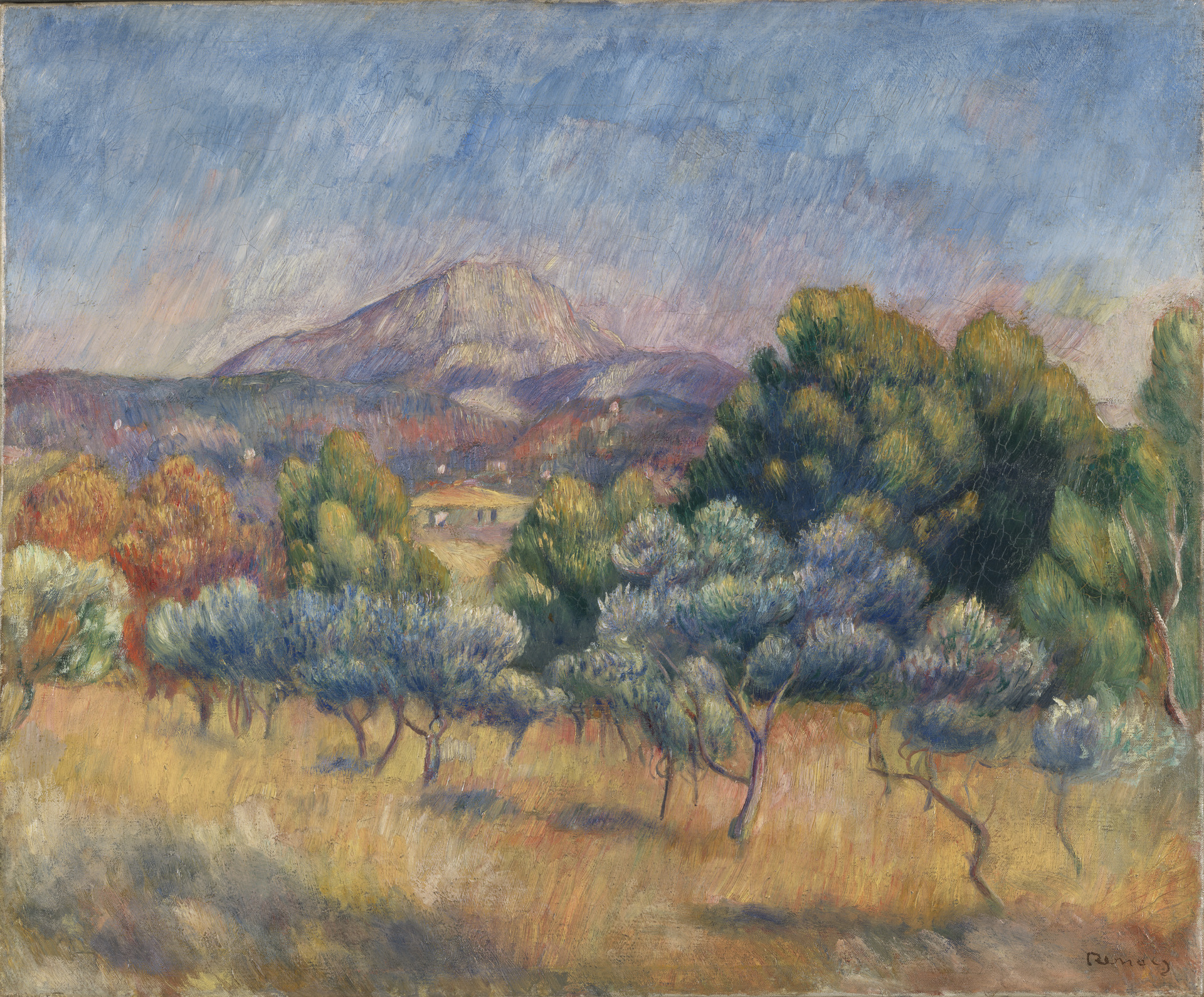
Pierre-Auguste Renoir, c.1888-89 Mount of Sainte-Victoire, oil on canvas, 53 x 64.1 cm, Yale University Art Gallery

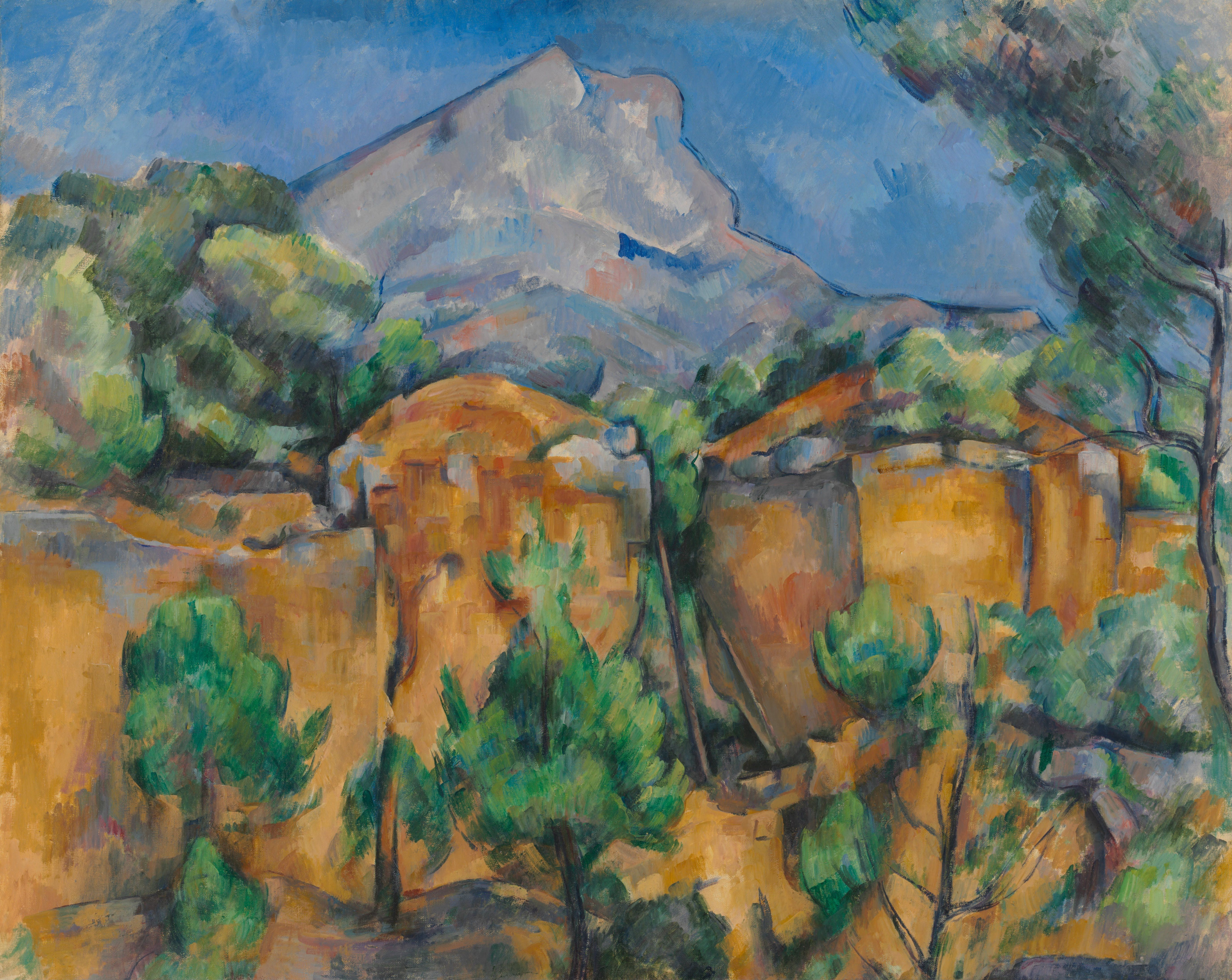
Paul Cézanne, c.1897, La Montagne Sainte-Victoire vue de la carrière Bibémus, oil on canvas, 65.1 × 81.3 cm, Baltimore Museum of Art

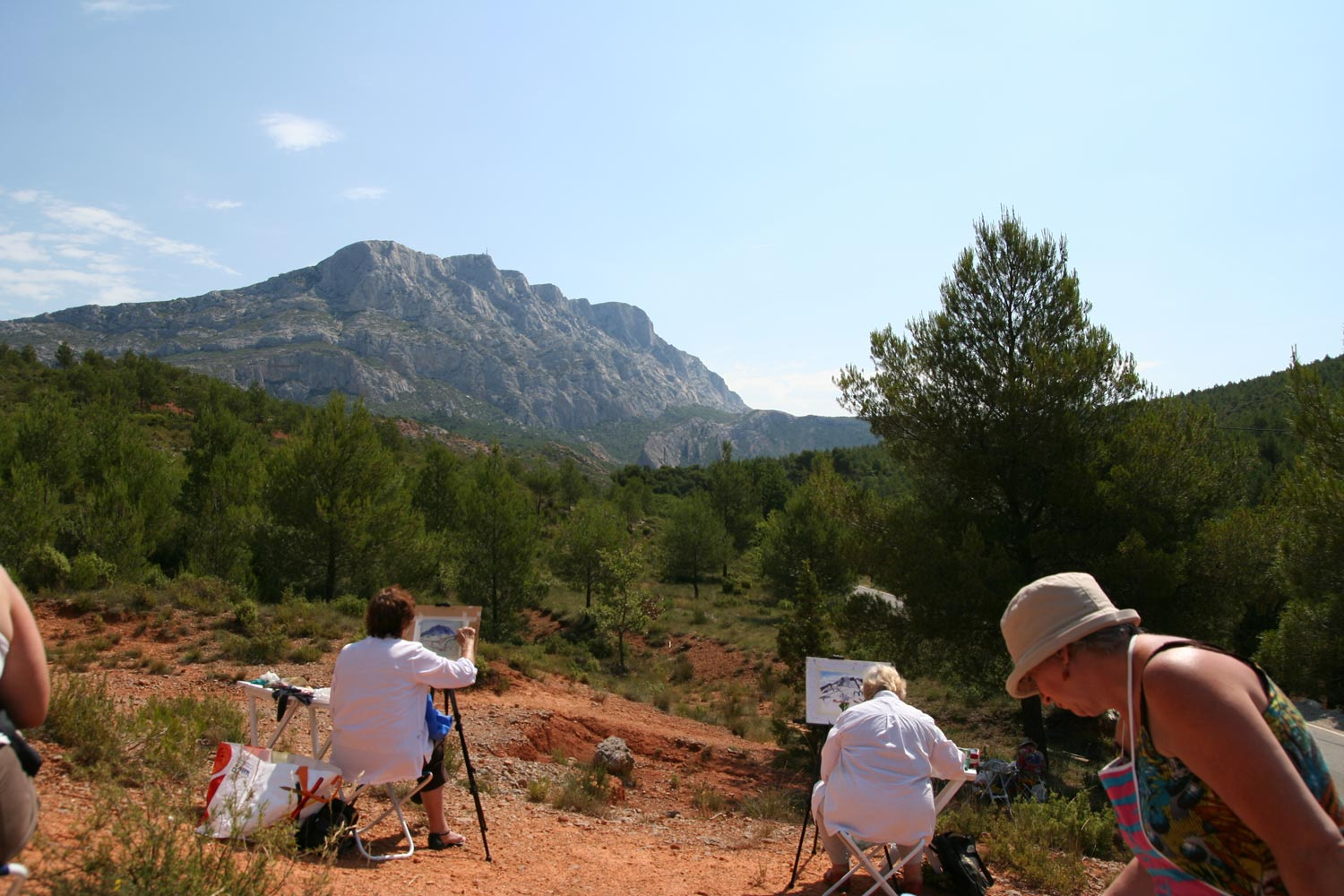
Painting Cézanne's mountain > Montagne Sainte-Victoire with Walk The Arts

== See also ==
- Art colonies
- Heidelberg School
- Urban Sketchers
