= Porfirio Salinas =

American painter

- Born: November 6, 1910; Bastrop, Texas, United States
- Died: April 18, 1973 (aged 62); San Antonio, Texas
- Education: Robert William Wood, José Arpa
- Known for: Landscape painting
- Movement: Early Texas, American Impressionism

Porfirio Salinas (November 6, 1910 – April 18, 1973) was an early Texas landscape painter who is recognized for his depictions of the Texas Hill Country in the springtime. He was one of the first Mexican American artists to become nationally recognized for his paintings. He was described by The New York Times as being United States President Lyndon B. Johnson's favorite painter. Works by Salinas are displayed in the Texas State Capitol, the Texas Governor's Mansion and in a number of museums including the Witte Museum in San Antonio, Texas, and the Panhandle-Plains Historical Museum.

== Early history ==
Salinas was born on November 6, 1910, near Bastrop, Texas, to a family of Mexican American tenant farmers. His father, Porfirio G. Salinas, and his mother, Clara G. Chavez Salinas, left the farm for San Antonio when Porfirio was a child. Salinas was a precocious talent who drew and painted from the time he was a small boy and received encouragement from his teachers. He had little formal education and left school when he was young in order to work in an art supply store. When he was fifteen, he met the English-born landscape artist Robert William Wood (1889–1979) at the store.

Salinas went to work in Wood's studio in 1925, where he learned the basics of being a professional painter. He stretched Wood's canvasses, and learned to frame paintings, how to mix paints and how to prepare canvas under Wood's supervision. Wood was a very capable businessman, and Salinas learned how to sell and market his art from the English painter. Salinas accompanied Wood and the Spanish-born artist and teacher José Arpa (1858–1952) on sketching trips to the hills and valleys surrounding San Antonio where they painted blooming wildflowers in the spring and the Texas Red Oak in the fall. With his talent and hard work he was soon capable of professional work.

== Professional career ==
Salinas began painting professionally in 1930, when he was twenty years old. His early work was influenced by his mentor Robert Wood's paintings. He painted many scenes of Texas bluebonnets, the state flower, which were sold to tourists by the artists and galleries in San Antonio, Texas. In 1939, he began working with the art dealer Dewey Bradford (1896–1985), who sold paintings, frames and art supplies in the state capital of Austin.

== National recognition ==
While Salinas sold his work steadily, by 1960 he was known primarily to Texas collectors and tourists who visited San Antonio. In 1961, this changed rapidly with the election of his collector Lyndon B. Johnson (1908–1973) to the Vice Presidency of the United States. With his ascension from the United States Senate to being Vice President, Johnson and his wife Lady Bird Johnson (1912–2007) purchased a large French-style chateau from the socialite and heiress Perle Mesta (1889–1975). They decorated the house with French antiques and tapestries that were already in the home, but the foyer was hung with Texas wildflower paintings by Salinas. Lady Bird Johnson was quoted as saying, "I want to see them when I open the door, to remind me of where I come from." At the time of the President Kennedy's assassination, Salinas had completed a scene of a horse drinking titled "Rocky Creek" that was meant to be presented to Kennedy during his ill-fated visit to Dallas. Lyndon Johnson told the Washington press that Porfirio Salinas was "his favorite artist." President Johnson also presented a Salinas painting to President Gustavo Diaz Ordaz of Mexico as an official gift from the United States. The patronage of the President was a tremendous boost to the artist's career and during the 1960s, his work sold briskly for ever higher prices. The Johnsons' Salinas paintings remain in the collection of the LBJ Ranch today. President and Lady Bird Johnson were both advocates and admirers of wildflowers. Lady Bird Johnson will always remain linked to the subject of wildflowers because of her "Beautify America" campaign and the Highway Beautification Act, which was passed by the United States Congress in 1965. As part of that effort, many miles of Texas roadsides were seeded with Texas bluebonnets, Lupinus texensis, the flowers that Salinas is known for painting.

== Death and posthumous reputation ==
Salinas was recognized by the city of his birth, Bastrop, Texas in 1960, when he was fifty years old. He had a solo exhibition at the Witte Museum in San Antonio in 1962. His work was widely published by the New York Graphic Society, which added to his national reputation. In 1967 his work illustrated a book titled Bluebonnets and Cactus that was published in Austin.

Salinas died on April 18, 1973, after a brief illness. He was memorialized in the City of Austin with Porfirio Salinas Day in 1973. Ruth Goddard wrote a book titled Porfirio Salinas that was published two years after his death. There is a Youth Art Exhibition showcasing work by K-12 students, named after the artist, held each year in Bastrop. In celebration of the centennial of Salinas' birth, the Witte Museum mounted an exhibition titled Porfirio Salinas: Painting South Texas that opened on October 16, 2010, and ran to March 20, 2011.

== Artistic production ==
The professional career of Porfirio Salinas stretched to more than forty years. According to the art historian Jeffrey Morseburg, he is estimated to have painted between two and three thousand works. His work is divided among a number of subjects, but Hill Country landscapes of the Texas bluebonnets predominate. The bluebonnet landscape has remained eternally popular with both collectors of historic Texas paintings and contemporary artists. Salinas also painted many scenes of Texas red oak trees in the autumn and prickly pear cactus. There were also scenes of the Texas desert in the Texas Panhandle and of arid West Texas. Salinas made trips to Mexico and painted rural Mexican villages and the volcanoes that are south of Mexico City. For Mexican American audiences, Salinas painted small scenes of bullfights, cockfights, and Mexican fandangos.

== Personal life ==
Salinas married Maria Bonillas, a Mexican woman who worked for the Mexican National Railways, in San Antonio in 1943. They had a single child, Christina Maria Salinas, who was born in 1945. Maria Bonillas Salinas helped manage her husband's career. The Salinas home and studio was located at 2723 Buena Vista Street in San Antonio. It consists of a small stone home with a detached studio.

== Public collections ==
- Panhandle–Plains Historical Museum
- Stark Museum of Art, Orange, Texas
- Texas State Capitol, Austin, Texas
- Texas Governor's Mansion, Austin, Texas
- R. W. Norton Art Gallery, Shreveport, Louisiana
- Amarillo High School, Amarillo, Texas
- Sangre de Cristo Art Center, Pueblo, Colorado
- Texas A&M University, College Station, Texas
- Modern Art Museum of Fort Worth, Ft. Worth, Texas
- Price-Daniel House, Austin, Texas
- Rayburn Library and Museum, University of Texas, Austin, Texas
- Witte Museum, San Antonio, Texas
- Lyndon Baines Johnson Ranch, Johnson City, Texas
- Muscarelle Museum of Art, Williamsburg, Virginia
