= Robert William Wood =

American painter

- Robert W. Wood
- Born: March 4, 1889; Sandgate, Kent, England
- Died: March 14, 1979 (aged 90); Bishop, California, United States
- Known for: Landscape painting
- Movement: California Plein-Air Painting, American Impressionism

Robert William Wood (March 4, 1889 – March 14, 1979) was a British-American landscape painter. Although he never became an American citizen, most of his career was in the United States, and he is designated as an "American" artist. He rose to prominence in the 1950s with sales of his color reproductions numbering in the millions.

== Early life ==
Robert William Wood was born in Sandgate, Kent, England. His father, W. L. Wood, was a renowned home and church painter who recognized and supported his son's talent. He forced his son to paint by keeping him inside rather than letting him play with his friends. At age 12, Wood entered the South Kensington School of Art (now the Royal College of Art), in Folkestone. While in school, Wood won four first awards and three second awards for his paintings.

== Career ==
After leaving England in 1910, Wood roamed the United States in search of landscape subjects. He lived in Maine, rural Ohio, Woodstock, New York, Seattle, Portland, Oregon, San Antonio, and Monterey, California. He settled in Laguna Beach, California in 1940. He was a popular exhibitor at the Laguna Art Festival and a Life Member of the Laguna Art Association. He was represented by galleries in Laguna Beach, Los Angeles, San Antonio, Dallas, Austin, Pittsburgh, Philadelphia, Atlanta, and Cleveland. He was also represented in the early San Antonio Plein-Air exhibitions in the 1920s, was active in the art colonies of San Antonio, Texas in the 1930s, in Monterey, California in the 1940s, and in Laguna Beach in the 1950s.

Wood's work was widely published by a number of publishers, the most prolific being Donald Bonnist's Donald Art Company which, in less than two years, distributed more than one million copies of October Morn, Wood's most popular print. The Donald Art Company stamp, D.A.C.N.Y., is found on millions of Wood reproductions.

Wood was at the peak of his fame in the 1950s through 1970s when his scenes of the Catskill Mountains in New York, the California coast, the Grand Tetons, the Rocky Mountains, the Texas Hill Country and the Cascades were most popular. His popularity made him a household name and millions of his reproductions were printed in large editions by a number of publishers. Titles like Autumn Bronze, Early Spring, Pine & Birch, Texas Spring, and The Old Mill are found in homes across North America.

== Later life ==
In the early 1960s, Wood moved to Bishop, California with his wife, the artist Caryl Wood. While in Bishop, the Woods became friends with landscape painters Robert Clunie and Richard Coons. The Woods sold the property to move to San Diego, where they restored a Victorian home. After a few years in San Diego, they returned to Bishop, where they purchased a smaller property.

Wood died in Bishop at the age of 90, just a month before a large retrospective exhibition was mounted at the Morseburg Galleries in Los Angeles, by Howard Morseburg and the Newport Beach gallery owner Raymond Hagen.

== Legacy ==
Wood was an extremely facile painter and his artistic production was substantial, in excess of 5,000 completed works. His work is sold at galleries specializing in historic American art and is sold frequently at auction, with his auction record in excess of $40,000.

== See also ==
- California Plein-Air Painting
- American Impressionism
- Robert Clunie, a California plein-air artist and Bishop friend
- Carl Hoppe, a South Texas artist who worked with Wood

== Sources ==
- Kronquist, Lawrence, Robert Wood, gallery brochure, Laguna Beach, California, 1973
- Gaston, Godfrey, Robert Wood Retrospective, Exhibition Catalog, Morseburg Galleries, Los Angeles, California, 1979
- Morseburg, Jeffrey, Robert Wood Centennial, Exhibition Catalog, Morseburg Galleries, Los Angeles, California, 1989
- Morseburg, Jeffrey, Robert W. Wood (1889–1979), unpublished essay, West Hollywood, California, 2007
- Interview with Howard E. Morseburg (b. 1924), Wood's Los Angeles dealer, Santa Ynez, California, 2010
