= Robert Clunie =

Scottish-American landscape painter (1895–1984)

Robert Clunie (29 June 1895 – November, 1984) was a Scottish-American plein air painter, specializing in California landscape art with a particular focus on the rugged mountain scenery of the High Sierra.

== Early life ==
Clunie was born in the village of Eaglesham in Renfrewshire, Scotland. His father was a professional golfer, golf course designer and gamekeeper on the Gilmore estate. As a child, Clunie began illustrating his school assignments with watercolor paintings, which attracted the attention of a teacher who organized an exhibition of his work which toured area schools.

Robert developed an aversion to the social class system then prevalent in Scotland, and decided to emigrate to the United States with his older brother William in 1911. Initially, they settled in Saginaw, Michigan. Several months later, the rest of his family also emigrated to Michigan.

He found work as a pin striping artist with A. T. Ferrell Company, which manufactured harvesters for farmers. Meanwhile, his father obtained commissions to design golf courses in Saginaw, Bad Axe and Bridgeport, Michigan.

In 1918, while his employer was on a winter shutdown, Clunie took a train trip to California, and took a temporary job pin striping carriages for the Los Angeles Creamery Company. He felt at home in Los Angeles, and spent two months exploring the area before returning to Michigan, determined to relocate to California. On his 23rd birthday, 29 June 1918, he applied for U. S. citizenship. It was not until 1939 that he was granted citizenship. On 29 October 1918, he left for California by car with his brother William. It took them one month to reach Los Angeles.

He found work as a set painter for Metro Pictures, later to become part of Metro-Goldwyn-Mayer, working on the film The Red Lantern. His next job was in the paint department at the American Beet Sugar Company in Oxnard, California. At this time, he planned to travel to Australia. Instead, he met Myrtle Ireland in Oxnard, and they were married on 20 June 1920. His mother died two weeks later. The couple began their married life in Saginaw, and Clunie returned to work at the A. T. Ferrell Company. During this period, Clunie began pursuing a serious interest in canvas painting.

Less than a year later, the couple returned to California, and settled in Santa Paula, Myrtle's home town. He entered into a successful house painting business with a partner, Sam Dunkle, with specialties including gold leaf lettering, wallpaper and faux painting. In 1923, he designed and built a modern new home that incorporated an artist's studio. He continued canvas and easel painting, increasingly concentrating on landscapes. He also became a serious amateur tennis player.

His brother William, a pilot, was killed in a plane crash in Flint, Michigan in 1927, which was traumatic as the brothers were very close. In that same year, he left the house painting business to concentrate on fine art.

== Early artistic career in Santa Paula, California ==
In the spring of 1928, he completed his first Sierra Nevada landscape, entitled Olivas Pack Station, a scene in Lone Pine. Mount Whitney towers in the background.

On 13 March 1928, Santa Paula was flooded when the St. Francis Dam, owned by the City of Los Angeles, collapsed, killing 600 people and destroying nearly 1200 homes. Clunie returned to house painting temporarily as the town was rebuilt, but still managed to complete 19 paintings that year.

Clunie was now developing a distinctive style as a landscape painter, and credited John Ruskin as an influence, especially his book Modern Painter, published in 1881. He was now supporting himself by selling paintings out of his home studio, and brisk sales continued into 1929. He spent the summer of 1929 in the Sierra with his wife, painting in Yosemite National Park and the Mammoth Mountain area, followed by an 8-week stay in the Palisades peaks east of Big Pine. He hired the Glacier Pack Station to move his gear by mule, setting up camp on a knoll between Fourth Lake and Fifth Lake. He completed at least 14 paintings in the Palisades, and had found his artistic home, as he would return to the same campsite about 30 times over the years.

He met California mountaineer and nature writer Norman Clyde during his 1929 painting trip to the Palisades, and they became lifelong friends. The two men shared an enthusiasm for prolonged wilderness sojourns, and in particular, a love for trout fishing. Clyde's biographer Robert C. Pavlik observed that "The two men shared a common philosophy as well. They shared a love of the mountains and each tried, in their own way, to capture the essence of their meaning." Clyde would often visit Clunie's campsite over the years to rest up between ascents, and referred to his camp as "The Palace Hotel". Twenty-five years later, on 9–11 September 1954, a severe early-season snowstorm hit the Sierra Nevada, and Clyde and a companion took shelter in Clunie's camp for four days.

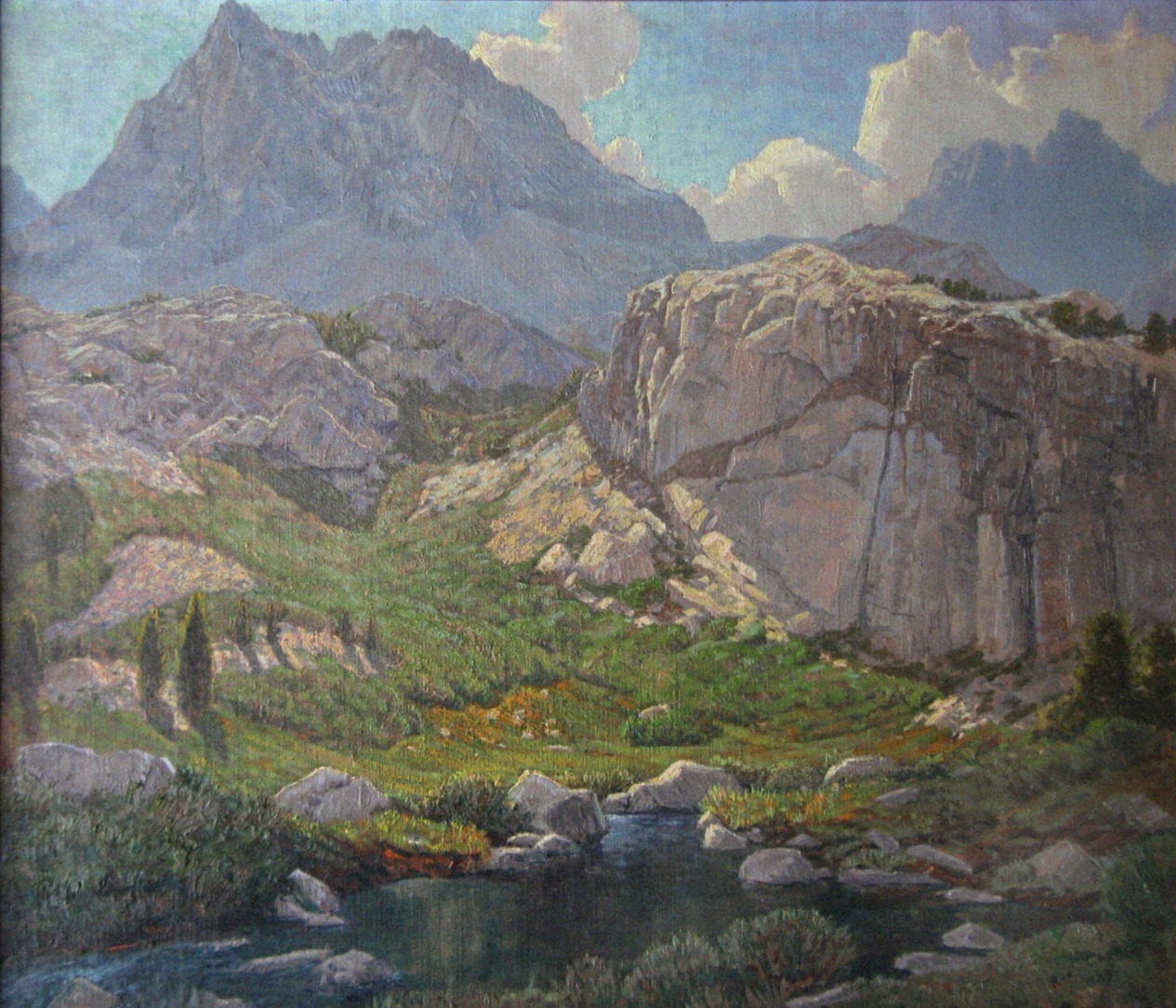
"The Cliff" by Robert Clunie, 1929

His 1929 Sierra Nevada paintings were received with great praise, and he sold at least fifteen paintings in the months that followed. The Biltmore Salon in Los Angeles arranged an exhibition of his paintings, and some were included in a group showing at the Stendahl Gallery. Los Angeles Times art critic Arthur Millier said of the paintings at the Biltmore, "Mountains are humbly approached by Robert Clunie, a young Santa Paula painter, whose paintings were for the first time shown to a few local critics and dealers in a sample room at the Biltmore. The works displayed made a very favorable impression on this reviewer who believes the artist to have already achieved some splendid Sierra painting, and to be in line to go much further." Millier went on to praise Clunie for his "careful observation of nature, a fine feeling for the grandeur of composition presented the artist by the architecture of the Sierras, and an eye for light as the medium that binds together the separate masses seen in nature." A reproduction of a Clunie painting called The Cliff illustrated the article. In the midst of these positive developments in Clunie's career, the stock market crashed on 29 October 1929. In the aftermath, customers canceled orders for paintings, not a single painting sold at the Stendahl Gallery show, and when Clunie went to pick up his unsold paintings, the most praised of them, The Cliff, had somehow been lost by the gallery. In the wake of this bad experience, Clunie decided to never again sell through galleries, and instead sold his work directly to collectors for the rest of his career. Better news was the birth of his son, Robert Kent Clunie, on 14 November 1929.

Clunie joined the California Art Club and the Painters and Sculptors Club, giving him an opportunity to exhibit his work outside of commercial galleries. The Los Angeles Times again praised his work on 21 December 1930, observing "for Robert Clunie the crags stand still with the utter stillness of hard granite while he paints the deep shadow tones of granite above a blue pool cut by the gold of a sand bar. In another canvas by him they thrust sharply into the sky, jostling each other in the impestuous force of upheaval." His painting Coast of Carmel was selected for the California Art Club Exhibition of 1931 at the Los Angeles Museum, which is now called the Los Angeles County Museum of Art.

During the 1930s, Clunie received several commissions to paint large dioramas at the California Exposition & State Fair in Sacramento. Crowds would gather to watch him paint.

In 1935, Clunie spent two months painting in Taos, New Mexico. Local painter Walter Ufer praised Clunie's work there, urging him, "Stay in Taos, Robert. You are giving it a new look." Ansel Adams called one of his Taos paintings, Vaya Con Dios - St. Francis of Assisi Mission - Moonlight a "masterpiece".

In February, 1937, Clunie won first prize in the Academy of Western Painters Exhibition for his painting Saginaw River. The painting won third prize at the California Exposition and State Fair in 1938.

He painted in the Grand Tetons each summer from 1938 to 1941, and the Los Angeles Times described his Teton paintings as "impressive" and said that "the artist has approached his subject with a bold, strong technique combining the finest in art with a reality and geographic correctness which has excited the highest admiration from the rangers in charge of the district as well as art critics". He became friends with mountaineers Paul Petzoldt and Jack Durrance in the Tetons.

When Germany invaded Poland in September, 1939, Clunie developed melancholia and was unable to paint for a year.

Clunie was an enthusiastic chess player. He beat Reuben Fine at chess on 15 September 1940. Clunie was the only player who beat Fine, a grandmaster, during his two-month tour of the country.

When the United States entered World War II, Clunie spent six months doing camouflage painting at Navy refuelling depots at Morro Bay and Cayucos, California.

In 1942, Clunie went back to his favorite painting location in the Palisades peaks, and returned every summer until 1966, usually spending about two months in the wilderness. He would usually hire five mules to pack in his gear.

== Postwar years in Bishop, California ==
Clunie and his wife purchased property below the Eastern Sierras in Bishop, California in 1945, and began building a home and studio. He announced that he was leaving Santa Paula, and the art community in that city organized an exhibit and reception in his honor, attended by over 600 people.

Prominent artists including Edgar Alwin Payne and Leland Curtis would often visit Clunie at his High Sierra campsite, and in 1947, 119 members of the Sierra Club camped close by. Edna Spalding of the Sierra Club wrote "The highlight of tonight's campfire program was the talk by Bob Clunie, the artist, whom we have all adopted as one of our own. We have cherished his friendly presence around camp -- and now can understand both the man and his pictures better for having heard him tell what these mountains mean to him, and how he feels it is his duty and privilege to tell the world about them."

His new home in Bishop was completed in 1948, and he sold his Santa Paula home. Gradually, he stopped entering his paintings in exhibitions, and concentrated on selling his paintings out of his studio or at his wilderness campsite. In 1955, he served on the Inyo County Grand Jury, investigating taxation of water exported from the Owens Valley by the Los Angeles Department of Water and Power. He developed a friendship with Robert William Wood, another painter who lived in Bishop.

In 1967, he and his wife took a painting trip to the coast of Maine.

In 1980, the Arts Commission of the city of Bishop honored him with a retrospective exhibit of 84 paintings. A banner hung over U.S. Route 395 promoting the two-week exhibit.

His wife Myrtle died in June, 1981.

In 1982, he returned to Yosemite Valley to paint for the first time since 1929, traveling with his protégé and biographer, Richard Coons.

In May, 1983, the Ventura County Historical Museum exhibited paintings by Clunie and Coons. Jane Nolan, critic for the Ventura County Star Free Press, wrote, "The soaring Sierra Nevada drew landscape artist Robert Clunie like a magnet. For more than 50 years, the Bishop artist has painted the pure colors of the mountains -- sky blues, pine greens and snowy whites." Clunie suffered a stroke during this exhibit. His health declined, and he died in November, 1984 in Los Gatos, California, near his son Kent's home.

== Legacy ==
Clunie's lost painting, The Cliff, which had been missing since 1929, came to light shortly after his death. The wife of art book publisher Walter Foster had received it as a gift from friends of hers in Napa, California. It is not known how the painting made its way there.

Clunie's home and studio in Bishop was purchased by painter Richard Coons, who renamed it the Coons Gallery. Since Coons' death in 2003, the gallery has been operated by his widow, Spotted Dog Press publisher Wynne Benti.

Clunie was a longtime advocate for a dedicated art museum in Santa Paula. The Santa Paula Art Museum opened on 14 February 2010, featuring works by Clunie and many of his contemporaries.

== See also ==
- California Plein-Air Painting
- Robert William Wood - landscape artist and Bishop friend.
