= José Arpa =

American painter

José Arpa y Perea
- Born: February 19, 1858; Carmona, Spain
- Died: October 1952 (aged 94); Seville, Spain
- Education: Academia Real des Bellas Artes, Seville; Eduardo Cano; Academia des Bellas Artes, Rome
- Known for: Landscape Painting
- Movement: Early Texas, Costumbrista

José Arpa y Perea (1858–1952), was an artist of Spanish birth who worked in Spain, Mexico, and Texas and was noted for his Costumbrista studies and his landscapes of Texas.

== Life and career ==
Arpa was born in Carmona, Spain on 19 February 1858, into a very modest family. His father was a cobbler. He displayed a talent for drawing at a young age and was apprenticed to a local painter and decorator. In 1868, he was sent to Seville to study at the Academia Real des Bellas Artes (The Royal Academy of Fine Arts). There, he worked as a house painter during the day, and attended art classes in the evenings. Later, he studied under Eduardo Cano at the Museum of Fine Arts of Seville, where he won the Rome Prize three times, allowing him to study at the Academia des Bellas Artes in Rome.

On his return to Seville, he found that the internationally renowned Spanish painter, Marià Fortuny was also working in Seville at the same time. Although the pair probably never met, Fortuny became a major influence on Arpa's work. On account of that influence, he developed a preference for 'plein air' paintings of typical Spanish subjects, which at the time was known in Spain as 'costumbrismo'. He remained in Seville for nine years, where he made many paintings, sketches and also completed a series of ceiling decorations in the Circulo Mercantil Sevilla (Seville Mercantile Building).

In late 1895 or early 1896, by which time he had become an established artist, Arpa sailed from Spain to Vera Cruz, Mexico and from there travelled to Texas. During his years in San Antonio, Texas he organized summer painting camps and influenced many painters, most notably Xavier Gonzalez, Octavio Medellín, and Porfirio Salinas. He was a founding member of the "Brass Mug Club", a group of artists that also included Julian Onderdonk, Rolla Taylor, and Ernst Raba. In 1923, Arpa opened a studio and art school in San Antonio, TX teaching landscape and portrait painting. He often took groups of students out into the hill country around the city to paint. Arpa exhibited and sold paintings in each of the places where he lived.

In 1932, he returned to Seville where he stayed until his death in 1952, at age ninety-four. Murals by Arpa were hung in the lobby of the San Antonio Express-News building in downtown San Antonio. Some of Arpa's paintings can be found in permanent collections at the San Antonio Museum of Art, the McNay Art Museum, and the Panhandle-Plains Historical Museum in Canyon, Texas.

== Work ==
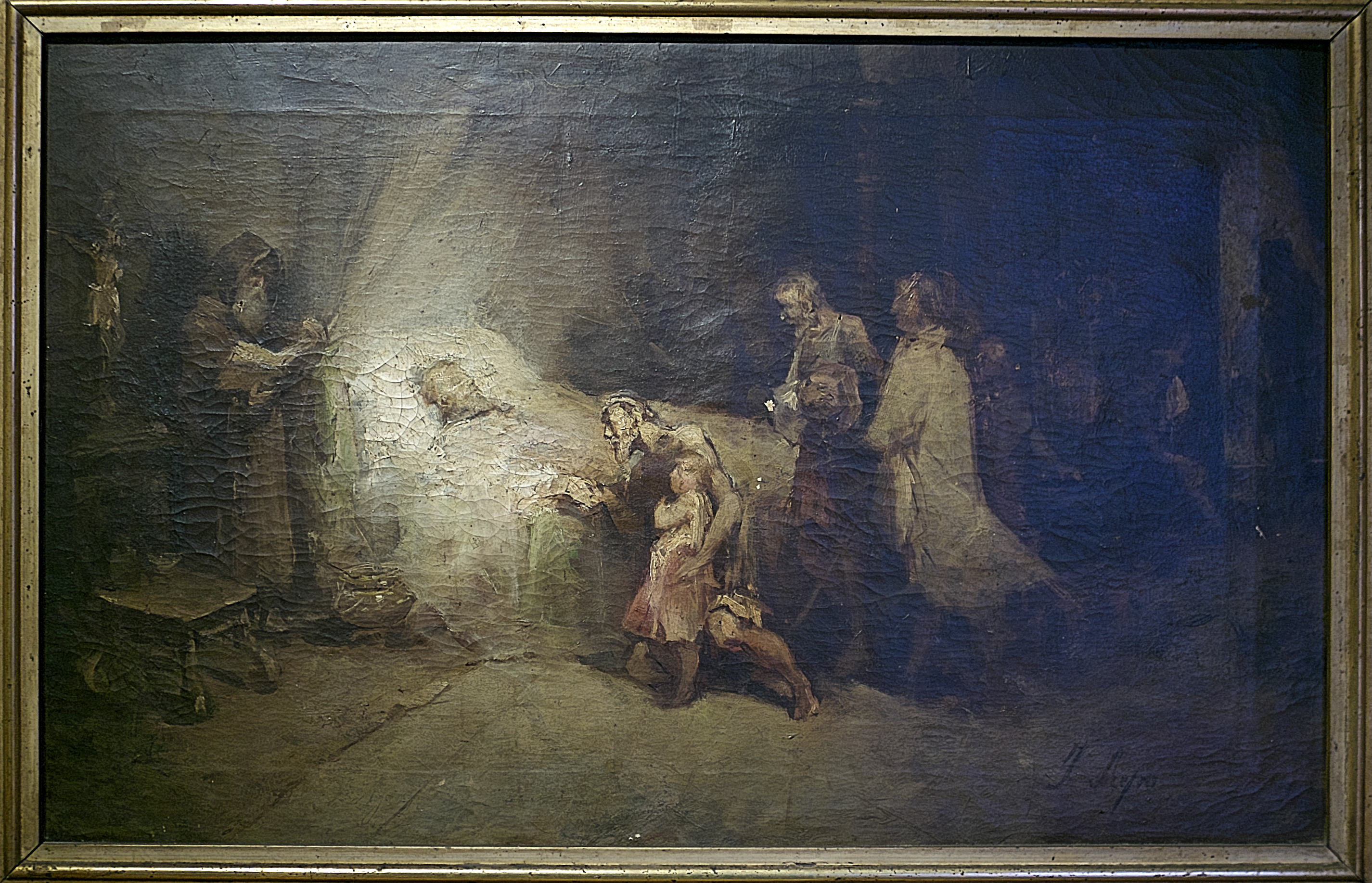
"Muerte de Miguel de Mañara" (c. 1885)

He painted in a realistic style, and was especially noted for his use of brilliant colors and his expertise in capturing the visual effects of sunlight. His work has been widely exhibited; ten of his paintings are in the collection of the San Antonio Museum of Art. He has been described both as an Orientalist and a Spanish impressionist.

Select list of works

- Puenta de Sevilla en Carmona Spain, Sketch
- Carnival De Ichu, [Peruvian Festival], Watercolor
- Escena Callejera, [Alley Scene], Watercolor
- El Monasterio, [The Monastery], Pencil drawing
- Ciudad italiana, [Italian City], Ink drawing
- Andalusian Woman with Guitar, Oil on canvas
- Cactus Flowers, Oil on canvas
- Sevilla, Oil on canvas
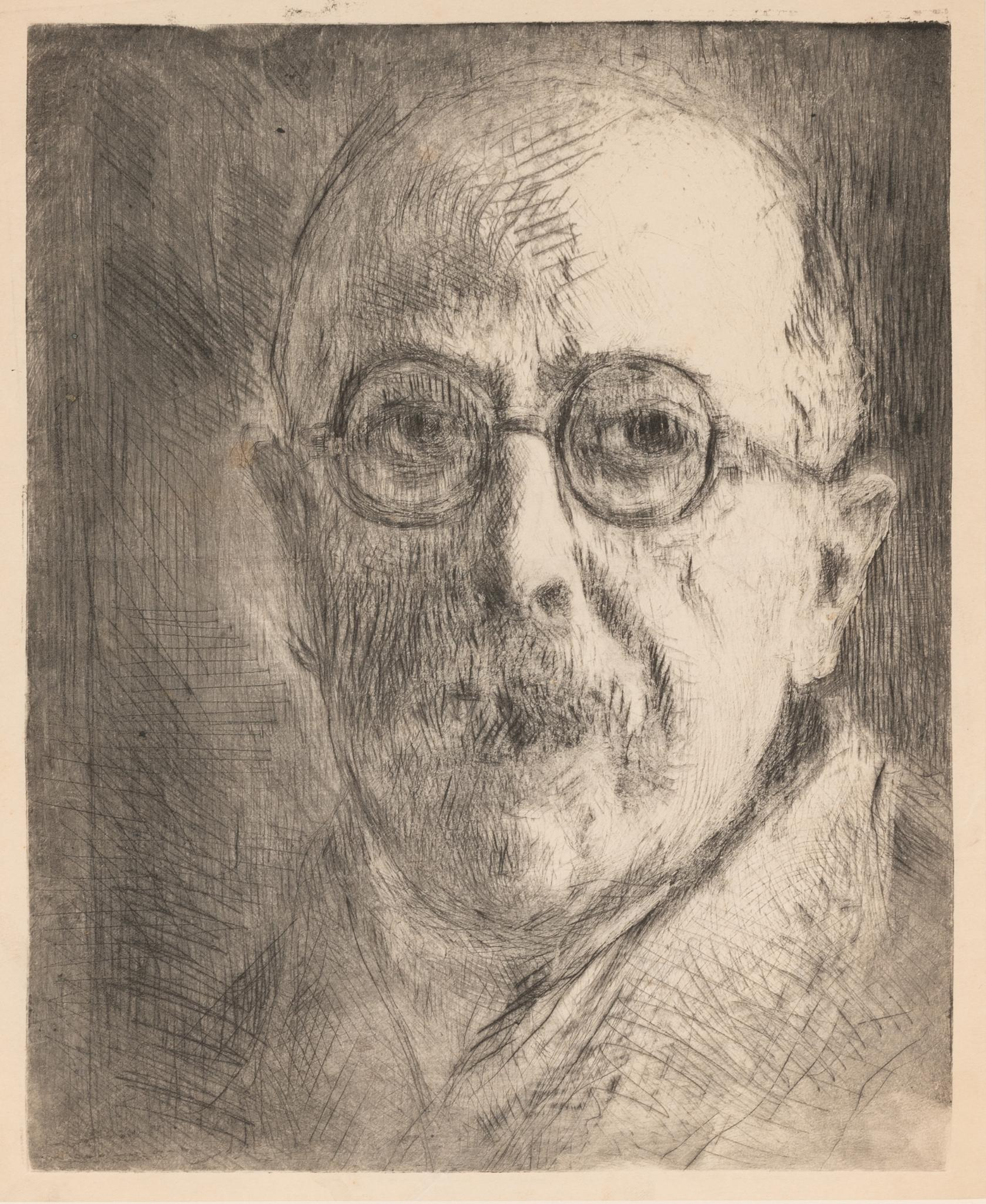
Jose Arpa, Self Portrait, c. 1927, etching on paper

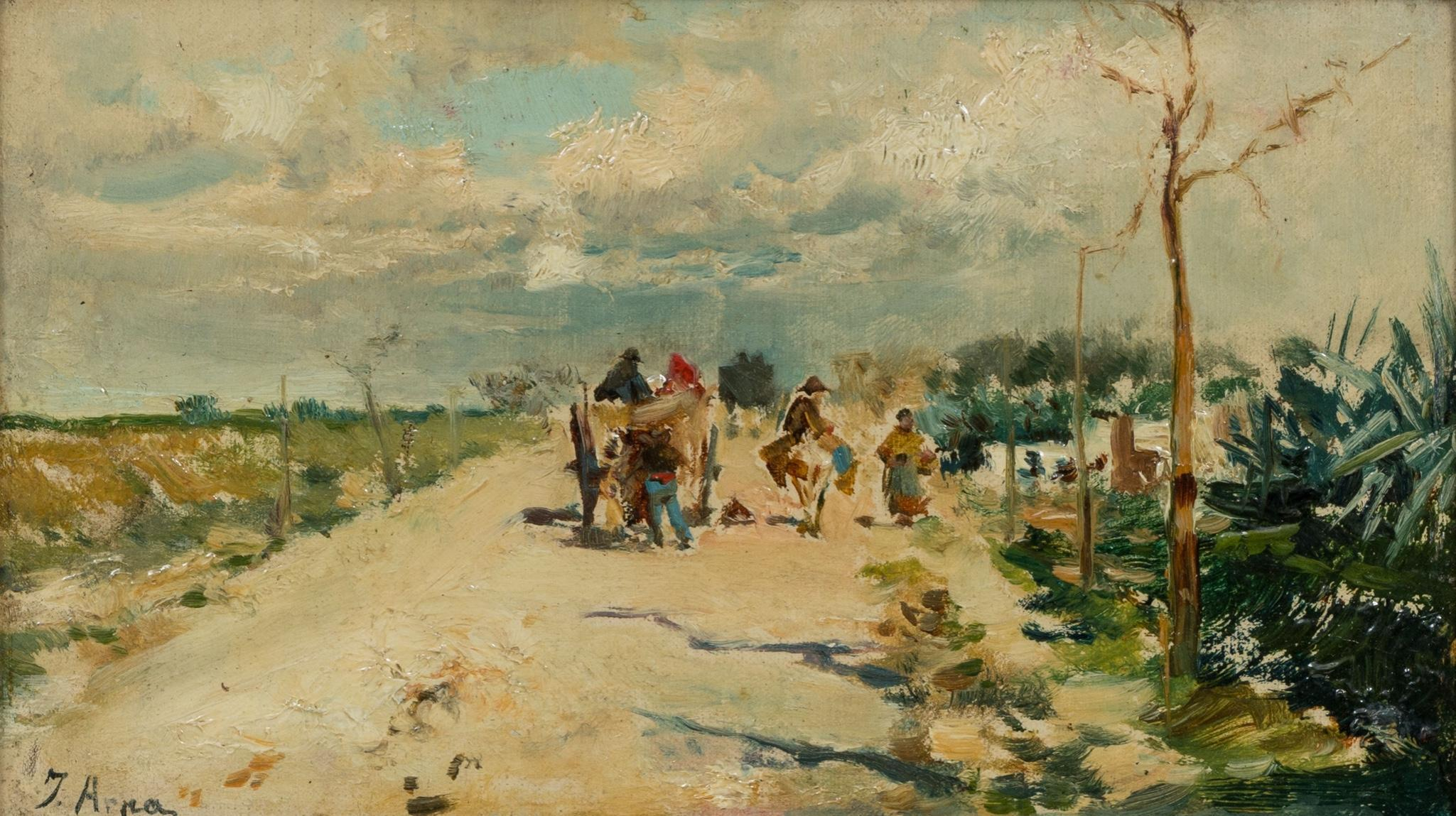
Along the Road, oil on board
