= Richard Coons =

American artist

Richard R. Coons
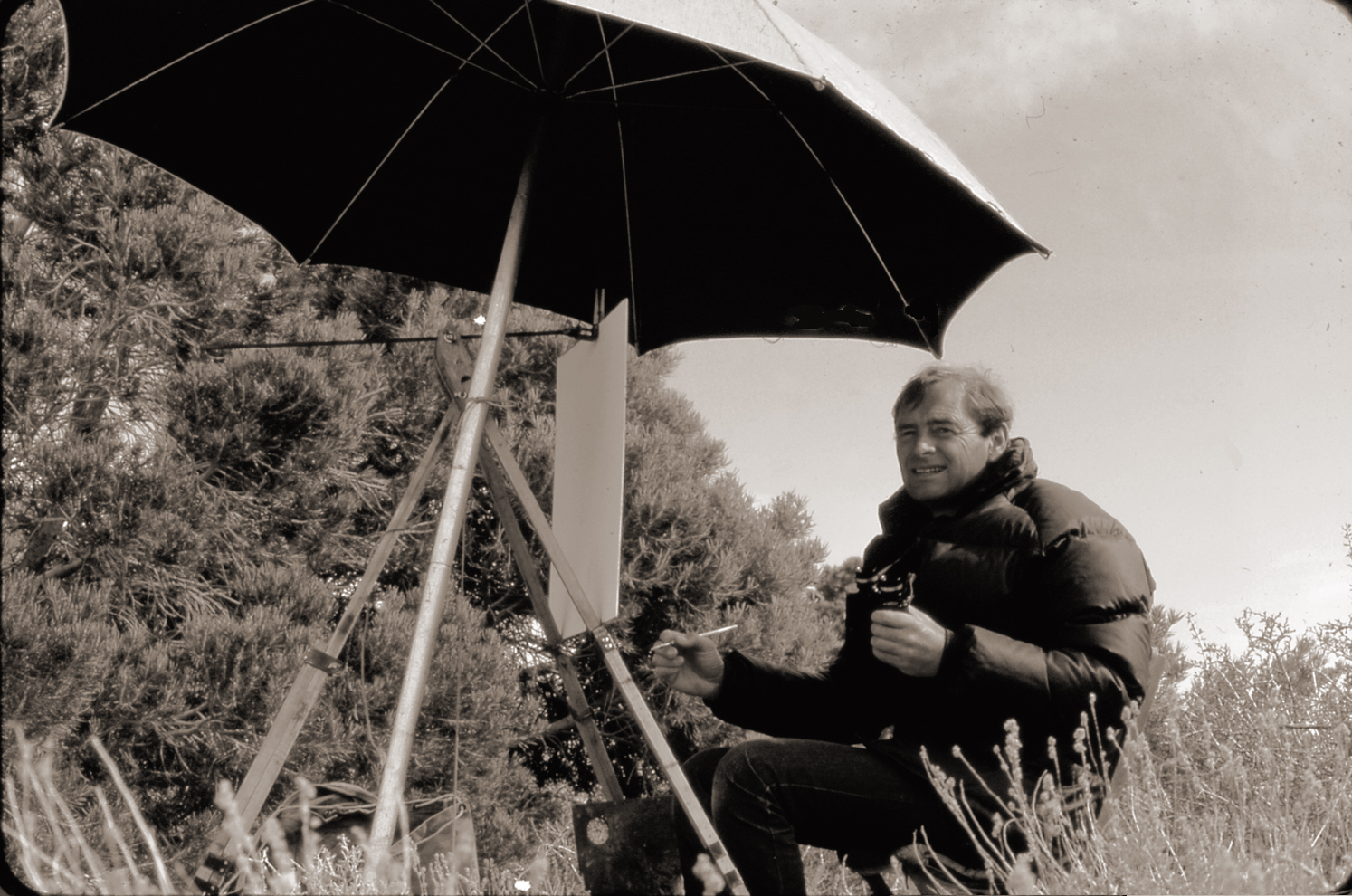
- Born: December 13, 1929; Los Angeles, CA
- Died: November 28, 2003 (aged 73); Bishop, CA
- Known for: Landscapes, marines
- Movement: California Impressionism, Realism
- Spouse: Wynne Benti; Marilyn Summers
- Children: Leann, Cheryl, Jill

Richard Rowland Coons (December 13, 1929 – November 28, 2003) was a California landscape and marine painter and author of the book Robert Clunie: Plein-Air Painter of the Sierra. He owned Coons Gallery in Bishop, California, the original art studio and residence built by the artist Robert Clunie.

== Early life ==
Coons was one of three sons born to William 'Bill' Coons and Grace Eva Manley on December 13, 1929 in Los Angeles, California. In November 1928, William Coons was hired by the City of Los Angeles Department of Water and Power as a member of the survey crew for the proposed Colorado River Aqueduct. The recently organized Metropolitan Water District of Southern California would be the agency authorized to oversee the construction of the aqueduct. Due to a delay in the start of the project, William Coons was temporarily assigned to field survey work in eastern California’s Owens Valley, where Los Angeles had large land and water holdings. The family moved back and forth between Culver City in Los Angeles and the Owens Valley towns of Bishop, Big Pine and Independence. By 1941, the family settled in Long Beach. Richard and his brothers joined the Sea Scouts. In response to the home front war effort, Richard became a civil defense volunteer, messenger class. Near their home on Elm Street was an extensive area of open marshland adjacent to the mouth of the Los Angeles River. Overgrown with willow trees and waterfowl, it was an ideal place to practice survival skills.

The brothers bought a 14-foot sailboat and portaged it from in a backyard berth several blocks, over curbs, through sand, to its launch into Alamitos Bay. For the next several summers, Richard secured work on fishing boats. Unconsciously, the observing eye of the artist within was storing away an inventory of memory, of the sea in all its capricious shades, the play of light or shadow on water.

Several times every year, the family returned to Bishop, California in the Owens Valley, to visit relatives. In 1946, at the end of his sophomore year in high school, Richard asked his parents if he could live with relatives in Bishop while finishing high school. They agreed, as his father's work would take them up to Bishop again.

When the family reunited in Bishop, Bill Coons worked with Mammoth Mountain Ski Area founder, Dave McCoy as a hydrographer. McCoy dreamed of finding a slope suitable for skiing and ultimately one on which a rope tow could be built. Richard often accompanied them, sitting in the back seat of their car, as they traveled on what are now abandoned roads, looking for a slope "good for skiing." Richard was on the Bishop Union High School's ski team coached by Tony Milici, Mammoth Mountain Ski Area's first Vice President.

== Early artistic influence ==
In the fall of 1947, Richard assisted his grandfather and the family business, Bishop Pumice Concrete Products, in the delivery of concrete blocks to artist and Bishop newcomer, Robert Clunie, a member of the California Art Club. The building materials were for the construction of the Clunie home and studio on Bishop Creek. Aware of Richard’s notable track accomplishments as reported in the local newspaper, and as an athlete of some note himself, Clunie struck up a conversation about sports with the younger Coons. Clunie’s son Kent enrolled that same year in Bishop High School and he and Richard quickly became good friends. Often a visitor in the Clunie home or accompanying Kent and 'Bob' Clunie into the Sierra backcountry, Richard observed Clunie, the artist, capture on canvas “the beauty and perfection” of nature. Clunie's were the first oil paintings Richard had seen close enough to touch. Not long afterward, twenty-year-old Richard purchased, by installment, his first Robert Clunie painting, "Monterey Boat Works". The painting is still in the collection of Coons Gallery and was exhibited in the Robert Clunie Retrospective (2013) at the Santa Paula Museum, Santa Paula, California.

In 1972, Clunie received a commission to paint Lake George above Mammoth Lakes area and invited Richard to accompany him and experiment with painting in the open, in "plein-air." At 43, Richard began painting. Clunie told him that a fledgling artist should never release any of his early works for at least one year "lest they come back to haunt you." Richard heeded Clunie’s advice and destroyed approximately fifty of his early paintings. With wry humor he mused, “They do make a nice fire."

In the years following the passage of the 1964 Wilderness Act, the United States Forest Service, during the course of its continued mission, to uphold the new permit restrictions on occupancy in the backcountry and to remove the remnants of human impact in the newly created wilderness areas, instructed Clunie to dismantle his 'permanent summer camp' that he occupied for years. The camp was located between Fourth and Fifth Lakes in the North Fork of Big Pine Canyon, next to the lower basecamp for The Palisade School of Mountaineering, started by Sierra mountaineer Norman Clyde and later run by author and guide, Smoke Blanchard and climbing guide, John Fischer. It took Richard, Kent, Robert Clunie and at least two USFS rangers almost three months to remove more than thirty years of accumulated possessions stored deep within the crevices of the granite boulders surrounding the camp. Because of Clunie’s lengthy career in the high country and the extensive collection of art that it inspired, Richard was obsessed with similar high mountain scenes, “where you find the granite peaks with snow and glaciers, white bark and lodgepole pines and the wonderful north face snowfields, the places you had to hike to—not the ones at the end of the road.”

The scenery of the Alpine Zone, at 11,000 feet and above, was Richard's favorite to paint, so he was away from home much of the summer. Although on occasion he hired a packer with pack animals, generally he hiked in to the selected area laden with a heavy pack of essential supplies for a ten-day excursion.

== Career ==
A year after Clunie’s death in 1984, the family sold the art studio and residence to Richard who opened Coons Gallery. With the help of Frenchy, a local sign maker, they built the monument sign that stands outside the gallery, on U.S. 395 at Tu Su Lane. The new studio provided the environment he needed to focus on painting. He was disciplined, in the studio every day at eight, then finishing up by two, so he could spend a few hours playing a round of golf at the local country club.

Often in winter, when the Sierra was covered with snow, Richard traveled to drier climates to paint. Laguna Beach, Virginia City, the Great Basin and Death Valley were some of his favorite locations. Once, while painting Dante’s View in 1982, a sand storm interrupted his work. Having left the windows of his trailer open for ventilation, he returned to find the bed and much of the interior covered with two inches of sand.

Unlike his mentor, Robert Clunie, who hired Glacier Pack Station to take him into the mountains, Richard carried a large external frame backpack, topped with a small easel, rolled canvas, an umbrella, his paints and brushes. He recalled a painting trip to Hungry Packer Lake, "Soon it began to hail. I was sitting under my big umbrella, not getting wet, but hailstones were hitting the meadow grass and boulders and bouncing two feet in the air like a million jumping grasshoppers. It began to thunder and lightning, closer and closer. I found myself down in the lowest spot I could find, between the big boulders, sitting on my foam rubber cushion and huddled in my poncho with the rain coming down in buckets and lightning and thunder banging all around."

He spent close to a year in Laguna Beach, associated with Larry Kronquist Gallery. At Larry's urging, he took a marine painting workshop with Bennett Bradbury in Monterey, California. He soon returned to the Sierra, and spent many months hiking into the backcountry with his painting canvases and supplies. In 1998, Coons wrote and published the definitive volume on his mentor’s life: Robert Clunie Plein-Air Painter of the Sierra.

An artist member of the California Art Club, Richard participated in many exhibitions, including several California Art Club Gold Medal Shows as well as a joint exhibition with Robert Clunie at the Ventura County Historical Museum (now the Ventura County Museum). He won many awards and placed in the National Parks Art For the Parks Top 100 competition. A prolific painter, Richard was able to complete a thirty by thirty-six inch oil canvas in two days. It is estimated that he painted at least 3,000 realist and impressionist canvases of primarily the Sierra Nevada, but also classic California landscape scenes and oceanscapes, from Monterey to Laguna. Following his untimely death from cancer in 2003, his wife, Wynne Benti, publisher of outdoor books at Spotted Dog Press, continued to keep the gallery open.
