= Urban Sketchers =

International art community

Urban Sketchers (USk) is a global community of artists who practice on-location drawings in cities, towns and villages where they live or travel. The Urban Sketchers movement began on Flickr in 2007, by journalist Gabriel Campanario. In 2009, Campanario established Urban Sketchers as a nonprofit organization with (501 (c) (3) tax-exempt status in United States. The Urban Sketchers Manifesto has since been translated into multiple languages.

The organization's motto is “We show the world, one drawing at a time!”

== History ==
Urban Sketchers started as a group on image sharing site, [Flickr], in 2007. The Urban Sketchers founder Gabriel (Gabi) Campanario is a Spanish journalist and illustrator living in Seattle. He is a journalist for The Seattle Times where he contributes as an artist and a writer to both the printed edition as well as blogs. As more and more artists began to submit and share their drawings online, Campanario started a group to support and promote journalistic drawing depicting real life as it happens in front of the artist.

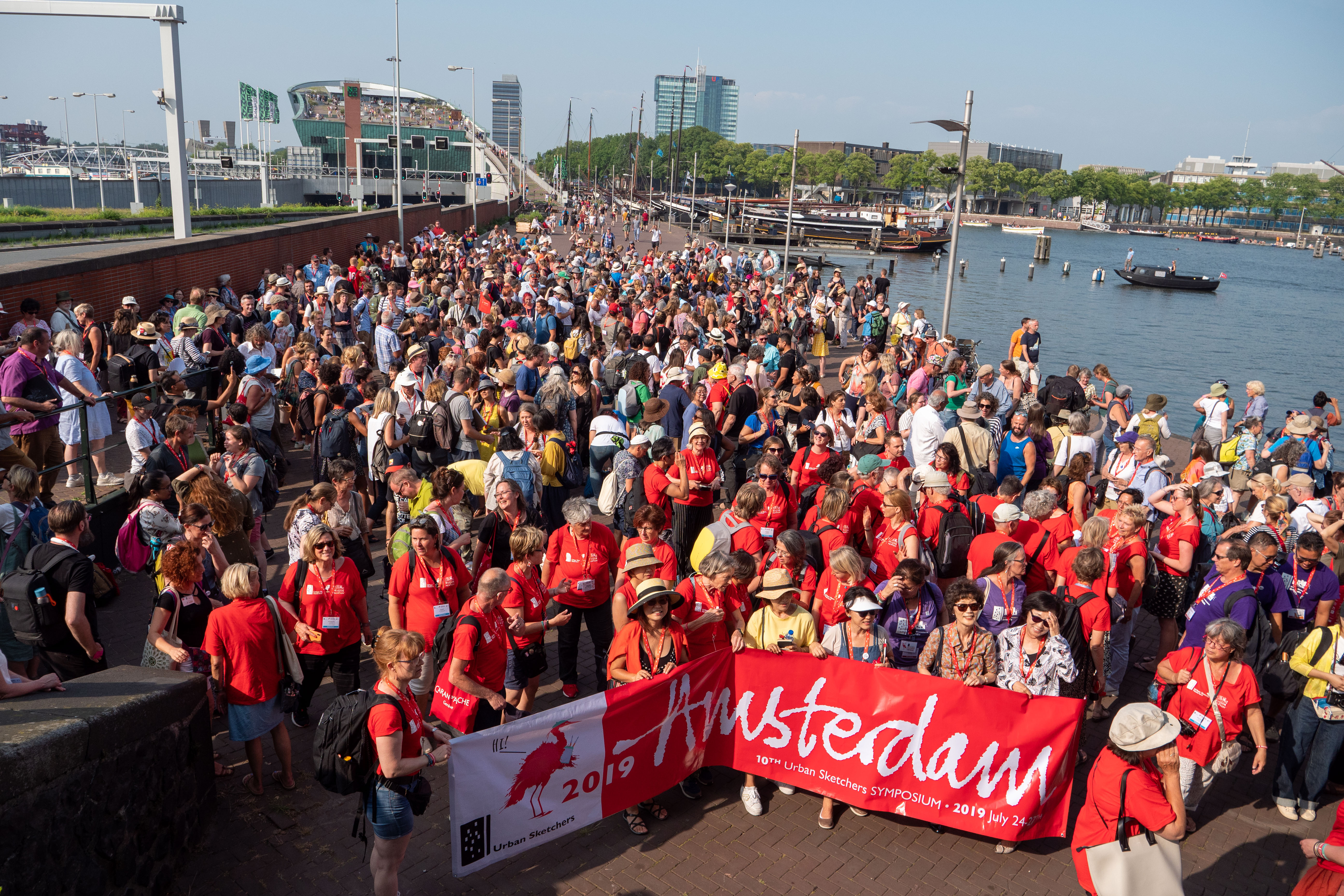
Hundreds of urban sketchers attended the 10th Urban Sketchers Symposium in Amsterdam, The Netherlands, in 2019.

A year later in 2008 Campanario created the Urban Sketchers blog. Participation in the Urban Sketchers blog is by invitation and is limited to a hundred artists. The term Urban Sketchers Correspondent was created. Correspondents are invited by Campanario and commit to contribute journalistic sketches on a regular basis. The sketches are accompanied by stories providing a background for the sketch: when and where the sketch was created and some details about content – words and narrative that go with pictures. The Urban Sketchers blog gained popularity between 2008 and the present, attracting hundreds and soon thousands of visitors daily.

In December 2009, Campanario established Urban Sketchers as a nonprofit organization (501 (c) (3) tax-exempt). A board of directors was elected. The organization's task is to raise the artistic, storytelling and educational value of location drawing, promoting its practice and connecting people around the world who draw on location where they live and travel.

== Activities ==
Urban Sketchers has a manifesto which reads:

1. We draw on location, indoors or out, capturing what we see from direct observation.
2. Our drawings tell the story of our surroundings, the places we live and where we travel.
3. Our drawings are a record of time and place.
4. We are truthful to the scenes we witness.
5. We use any kind of media and cherish our individual styles.
6. We support each other and draw together.
7. We share our drawings online.
8. We show the world, one drawing at a time.

=== Sketching ===
Urban Sketchers is a diverse group of people united by a passion for sketching. Discussions, for example about supplies and materials, take place when sketchers meet in real life or virtually.

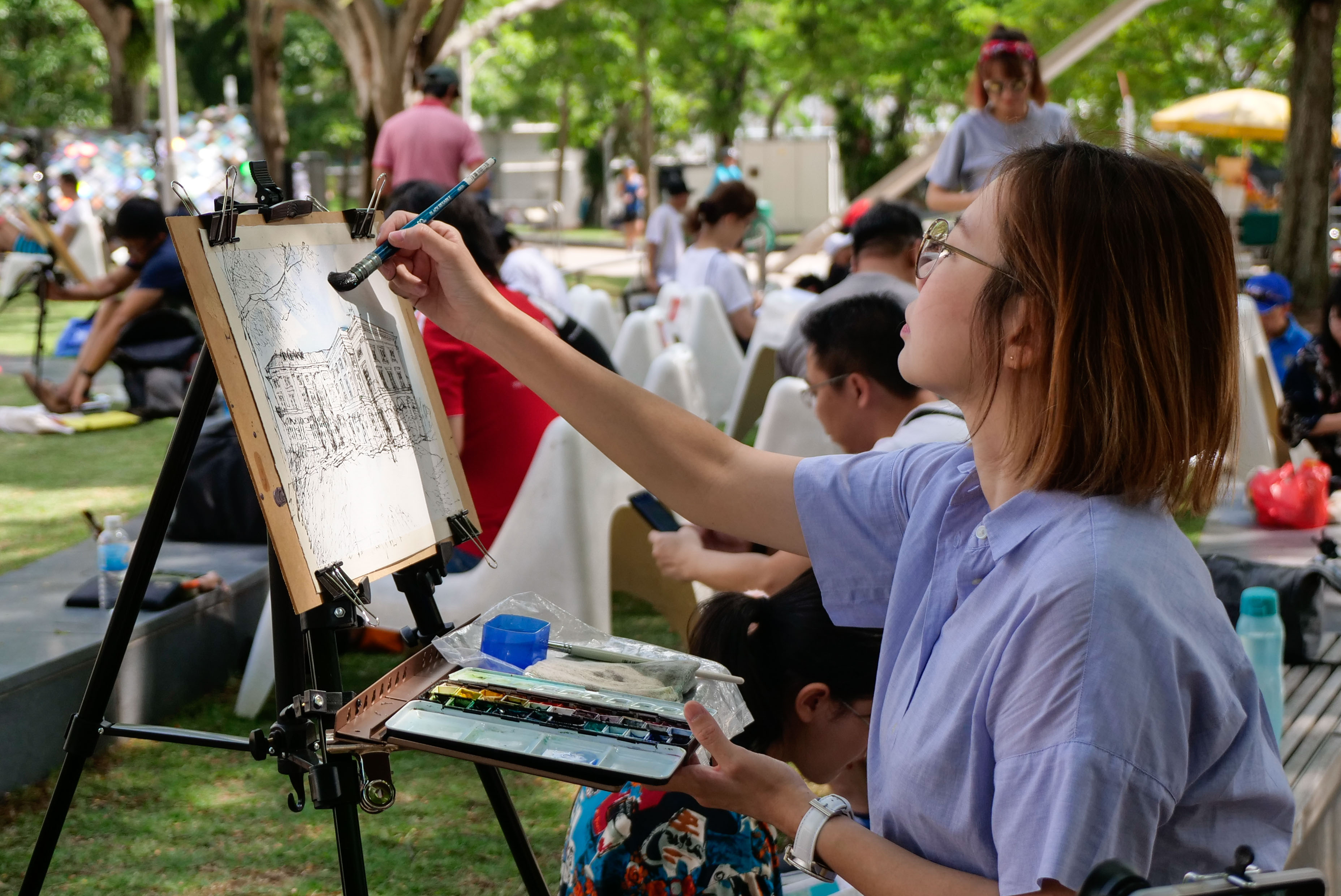
A group of urban sketchers drawing and painting outside the Asian Civilisation Museum in Singapore.

Sketching in public creates opportunities for interaction. The majority of these interactions are positive and good-natured. In some instances, sketching in a café has produced a free coffee from a proprietor, and on a rare occasion sketching produced an invitation to sketch a cultural event that otherwise would be closed to an outsider. For example, a group of aspiring musicians, Flon Flon en Musette, were performing a street concert that was documented by an Urban Sketcher who happened to be on site. The sketch then made it onto the face of the group's compilation CD and the sketcher was invited to a private concert.

In 2011 Campanario published a book, The Art of Urban Sketching, highlighting hundreds of the best Urban Sketchers members' work.

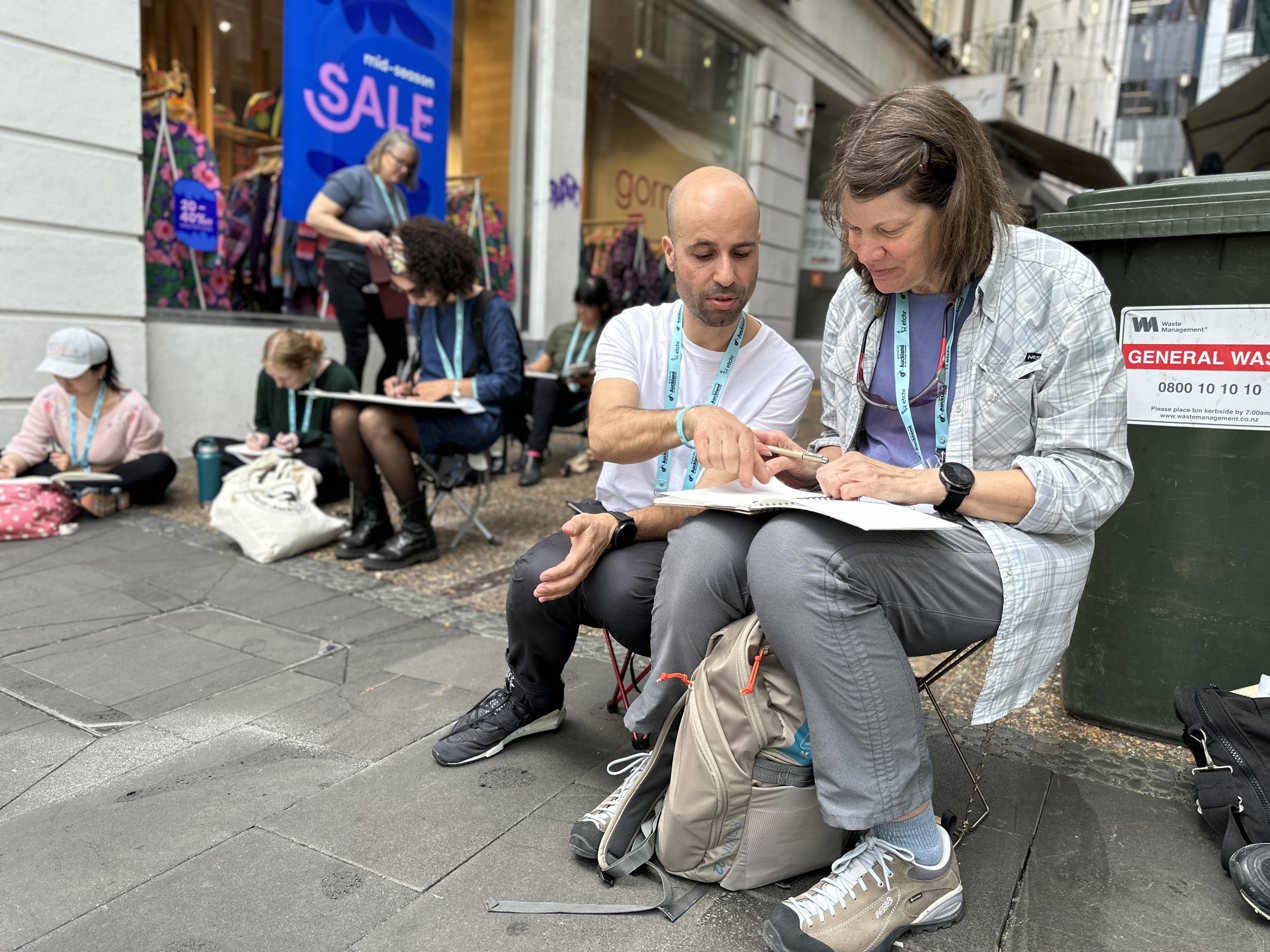
Urban sketchers drawing on location in Auckland, New Zealand, during the 11th Urban Sketchers Symposium, 2023

=== Symposiums ===
Urban Sketchers organization organizes Urban Sketchers Symposiums. These are festive gatherings of artists, where for 3 days sketchers draw on location, attend numerous workshops, panel discussions, lectures, meet each other in person and draw.

- The 1st Urban Sketchers Symposium was hosted in Portland, Oregon, USA July 29 – 31, 2010.
- The 2nd Urban Sketchers Symposium was hosted in Lisbon, Portugal on July 21–23, 2011. It was attended by 200 people.
- The 3rd Urban Sketchers Symposium was hosted in Santo Domingo, Dominican Republic, July 12 – 14, 2012
- The 4th Urban Sketchers Symposium was hosted in Barcelona, July 11–13, 2013.
- The 5th Urban Sketchers Symposium was hosted in Paraty, Brazil, August 27–30, 2014.
- The 6th Urban Sketchers Symposium was hosted in Singapore, July 22–25, 2015.
- The 7th Urban Sketchers Symposium was hosted in Manchester, England, July 27–30, 2016.
- The 8th Urban Sketchers Symposium was hosted in Chicago, Illinois, USA, July 26–29, 2017.
- The 9th Urban Sketchers Symposium was hosted in Porto, Portugal, July 17–21, 2018.
- The 10th Urban Sketchers Symposium was hosted in Amsterdam, Netherlands, July 24–27, 2019.
- The 11th Urban Sketchers Symposium was to be hosted in Hong Kong, April 8–11, 2020. However, due to the pandemic, the 2020 symposium was canceled
- 2021 & 2022 symposium canceled
- The 11th Urban Sketchers Symposium was hosted in Auckland, New Zealand, April 19-22, 2023.
- The 12th Urban Sketchers Symposium was hosted in Buenos Aires, Argentina, October 9-12, 2024.
- The 13th Urban Sketchers Symposium was hosted in Poznań, Poland, August 20-23, 2025.
- The 14th Urban Sketchers Symposium will be hosted in Toulouse, France, July 15-18, 2026.

=== Workshops ===
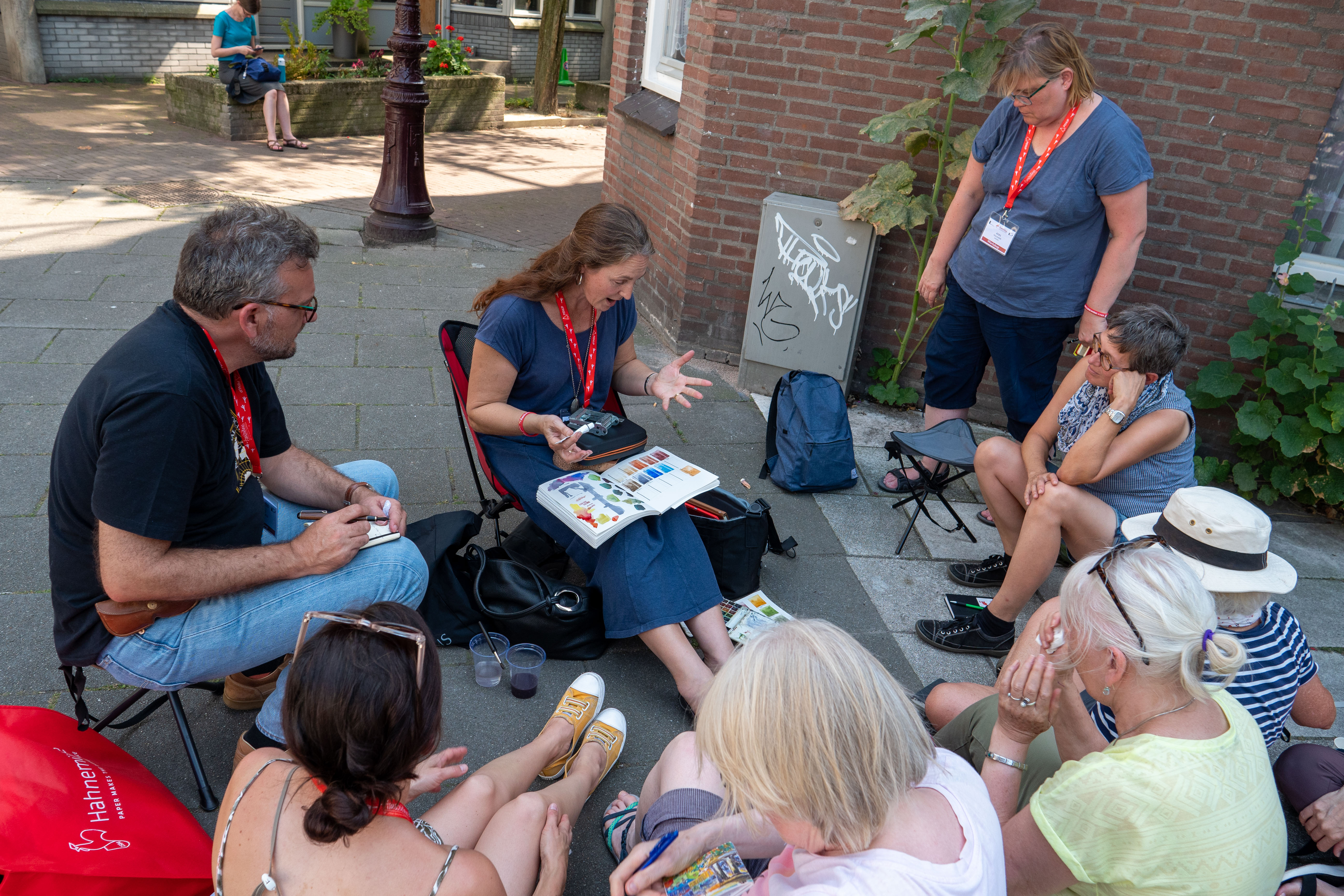
An urban sketching workshop held on location in Amsterdam, The Netherlands, during the 10th Urban Sketchers Symposium, 2019

Artists who contribute to Urban Sketchers can host workshops for sketching enthusiasts around the world. The workshops aim to teach skills useful to the practice of urban sketching. Workshops can cover a variety of topics, such as perspective, panoramas, and people, and take place in the urban environment appropriate for the topic.

== Communities ==
Urban Sketchers created many regional communities. Correspondents of the original Urban Sketchers blog and Flickr group organized local sketchers and number of local sketching groups were started. Other grass roots leaders started groups and brought them under Urban Sketchers umbrella.

Regional Urban Sketchers groups function similar to the main global group. All embrace the vision of the Urban Sketchers Manifesto as leading guidelines, while each group maintains its local and cultural individuality. Many groups have their own blogs where correspondents are invited based on local criteria, Facebook and Flickr groups where all are welcome.

Urban Sketchers communities are active in many countries of Europe, in North and South America and Asia.

== Worldwide Events ==
International Urban Sketchers Week is a global celebration of on-location drawing and takes place 1-7 May every year.
