= Panhandle–Plains Historical Museum =

History museum in Canyon, Texas

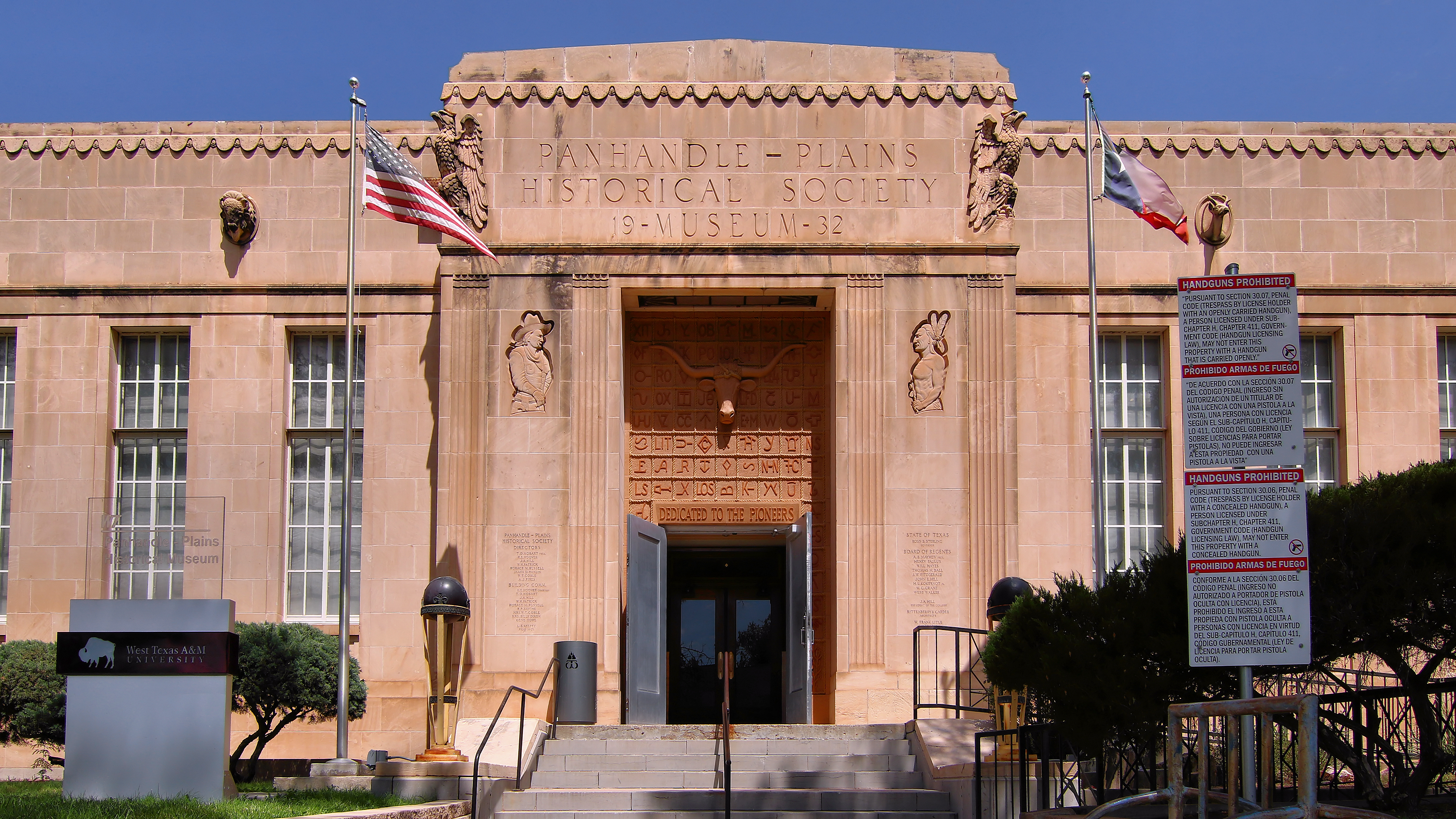
- Museum main entrance
- Interactive fullscreen map
- Established: April 14, 1933; 92 years ago
- Location: 2503 4th Avenue; Canyon, Texas 79015
- Coordinates: 34°58′48″N 101°55′01″W
- Visitors: 55,000 (2021)
- Founder: Panhandle-Plains Historical Society
- Director: Andrew Hay
- Curator: Deana Craighead; Jenni Opalinski; Veronica Arias
- Website: panhandleplains.org

Panhandle–Plains Historical Museum is a history museum located on the campus of West Texas A&M University in Canyon, Texas, United States, a small city south of Amarillo. The museum's contents are owned and controlled by the Panhandle-Plains Historical Society, while West Texas A&M University and the Texas A&M University Board of Regents maintain and provide the facilities. Panhandle–Plains Historical Museum is the largest history museum in the state of Texas with 70,000 visitors annually and more than three million artifacts. The museum has been closed since March 2025 after a Texas State Fire Marshal inspection identified significant life-safety concerns in the nearly century-old building.

The museum's permanent exhibits include American Western life and agriculture history artifacts, art, paleontology, geology, Native American art and artifacts, firearms, antique vehicles, decorative arts and furniture, petroleum industry artifacts, sports artifacts, and textiles. The museum also features the outdoor Pioneer Town that includes a livery, saloon, schoolhouse, pioneer cabin and other buildings.

The Panhandle-Plains Historical Society was founded in 1921 by faculty and students of West Texas State Teachers College and area supporters to preserve the history of pioneer life and natural history in the West Texas region. The museum received financial assistance from the Commission of Control for the 1936 Texas Centennial. The museum opened its permanent and present location on April 14, 1933.

The noted historian Angie Debo served as curator of the museum from 1933 to 1934.

In 2001, the museum underwent a $5.8 million renovation.

Some of the permanent exhibits include "People of the Plains: Experiments in Living", displays the difference and similarities of past and present Southern Plains settlers; "Pioneer Town", a recreation of a small settlement in the Texas Panhandle in the early 1900s; "The Don D. Harrington Petroleum Wing", a two floor exhibit showing the Texas Panhandle's oil boom years in the 1920s and 1930s; and "The T-Anchor Ranch House", an exhibit outside of the museum which recreates the original house that was constructed in the late 1870s.

West Texas A&M University President Walter V. Wendler announced on December 16, 2025 that the university had formally asked the Panhandle-Plains Historical Society to develop a plan to relocate its museum collection from the WTAMU campus, citing long-term declines in state funding, rising operating costs, and safety concerns related to the aging facility.

== Gallery ==
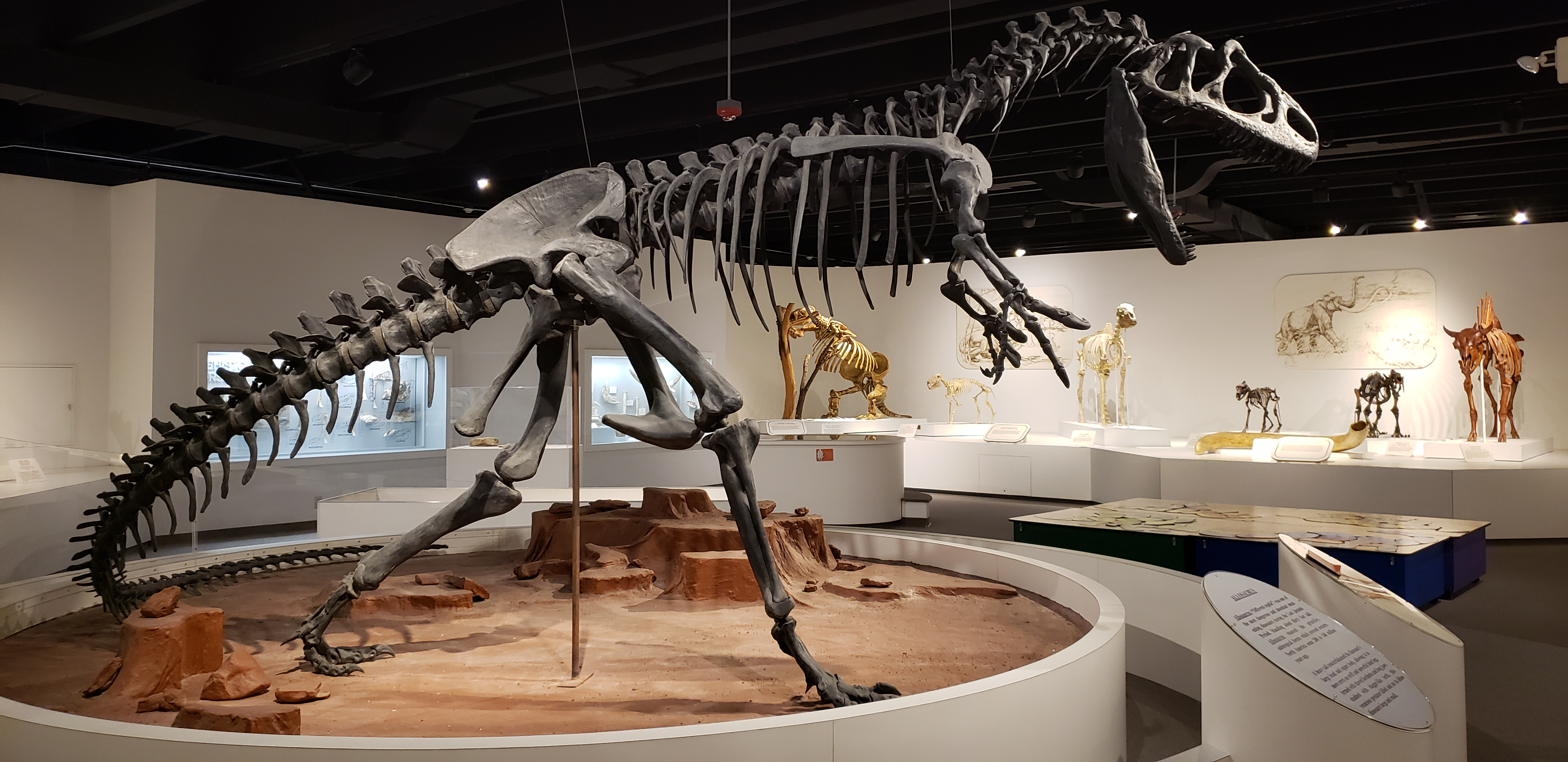
Paleontology gallery

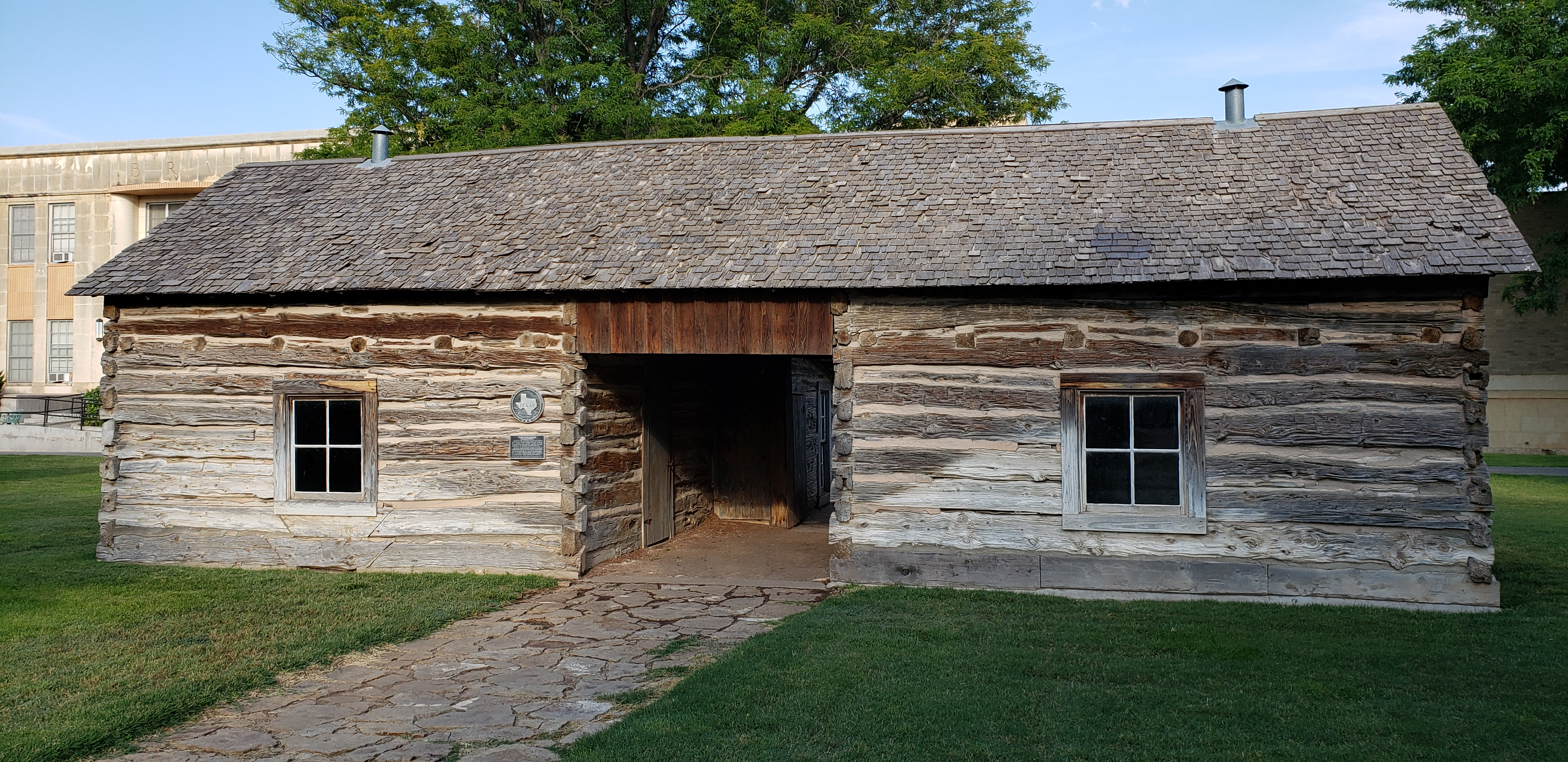
Pioneer cabin

== See also ==
- Recorded Texas Historic Landmarks in Randall County
