= Paul Biva =

French painter (1851–1900)

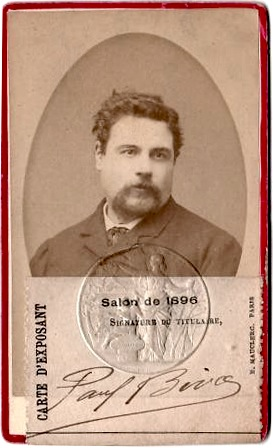
- Salon de 1896 exhibition card
- Born: Paul Biva; 19 September 1851; Montmartre, Paris, France
- Died: 13 June 1900 (aged 48); Avon, Seine-et-Marne, France
- Known for: Painting
- Notable work: Nature morte avec des fleurs; Pivoines et mimosa dans un vase en cuivre; Fresh from the Garden
- Movement: Realism, Naturalism, Impressionism, Post-Impressionism

Paul Biva (Montmartre 19 September 1851 – 13 June 1900, Avon, Seine-et-Marne) was a French painter. His paintings, both Realist, Naturalist in effect, principally represented intricate landscape paintings or elaborate flower settings, much as the work of his older brother, the artist Henri Biva (1848–1929). Paul Biva was a distinguished member of National Horticultural Society of France from 1898 until his untimely death two years later.

== Biography ==
Biva Paul was raised in a family originally from Alsace and Grisons. His father, Charles Biva (1821 Mulhouse – 1884 Paris) was a graphic designer and entrepreneur. In 1845 he opened a wallpaper factory in Montmartre. Very young, the two brothers, Paul and Henri Biva, learned to draft designs for the family business. Biva's delicacy and sureness of line features, colors and compositions of bouquets and still lifes comes in part from this particular training—also in the artistic context of Montmartre at the time.

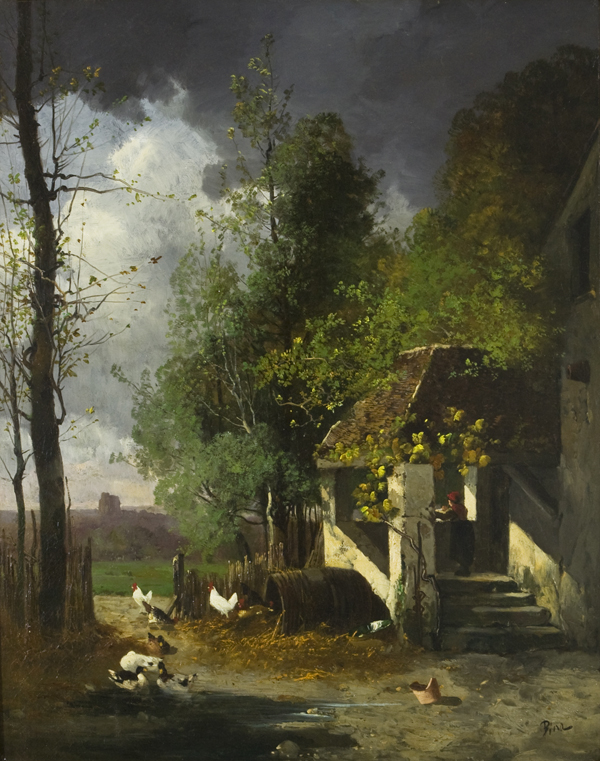
Paul Biva, Le Matin à Villeneuve l’Étang (1873), musée des beaux-arts de Troyes

In addition to the burden of work for the family business, Paul Biva enlisted in the Garde Nationale for compulsory military service during a difficult political and social period: the War of 1870 just ended, initiating the insurgency period of the City of Paris.

After the Salon of 1878, Paul Biva almost continuously exhibited to Salon des artistes français and other salons in Paris and Province until his untimely death in 1900.

The Baron Alphonse James de Rothschild purchased Chrysanthèmes, exhibited by Paul Biva at the Salon of 1893 and donated to the Musée de Saint-Malo.

Paul Biva lived at 128, rue du Faubourg-Poissonnière, and from 1897 at 12, rue d'Hauteville, according to the catalogue of 1912 Salon de la Société des artistes français.

== Œuvre ==
His artistic legacy mixes the baroque tradition of Dutch still lifes, the simplicity of Jean-Baptiste-Siméon Chardin (1699–1779), rediscovered at the time by the artistic community, and the energy of painters Realist painting after the biennial Salon of 1850. Thereafter, Paul Biva became sensitive to Impressionist movement of the 1870s.

The influence of the artistic environment in Montmartre also played a vital role, as expressed by André Roussard:

From Romanticism of the 1830s to Surrealism of the 1820s, we can state that Montmartre was at the origin, or at least involved in the creative period of the various successive movements. And especially, from 1850 to 1914, assembled here was an ensemble of painters and artists, poets, writers and musicians unparalleled in history, who revolutionized the arts and particularly the Fine arts. They lived in an artistic atmosphere and intellectual ferment which undoubtedly will never exist again with such intensity.

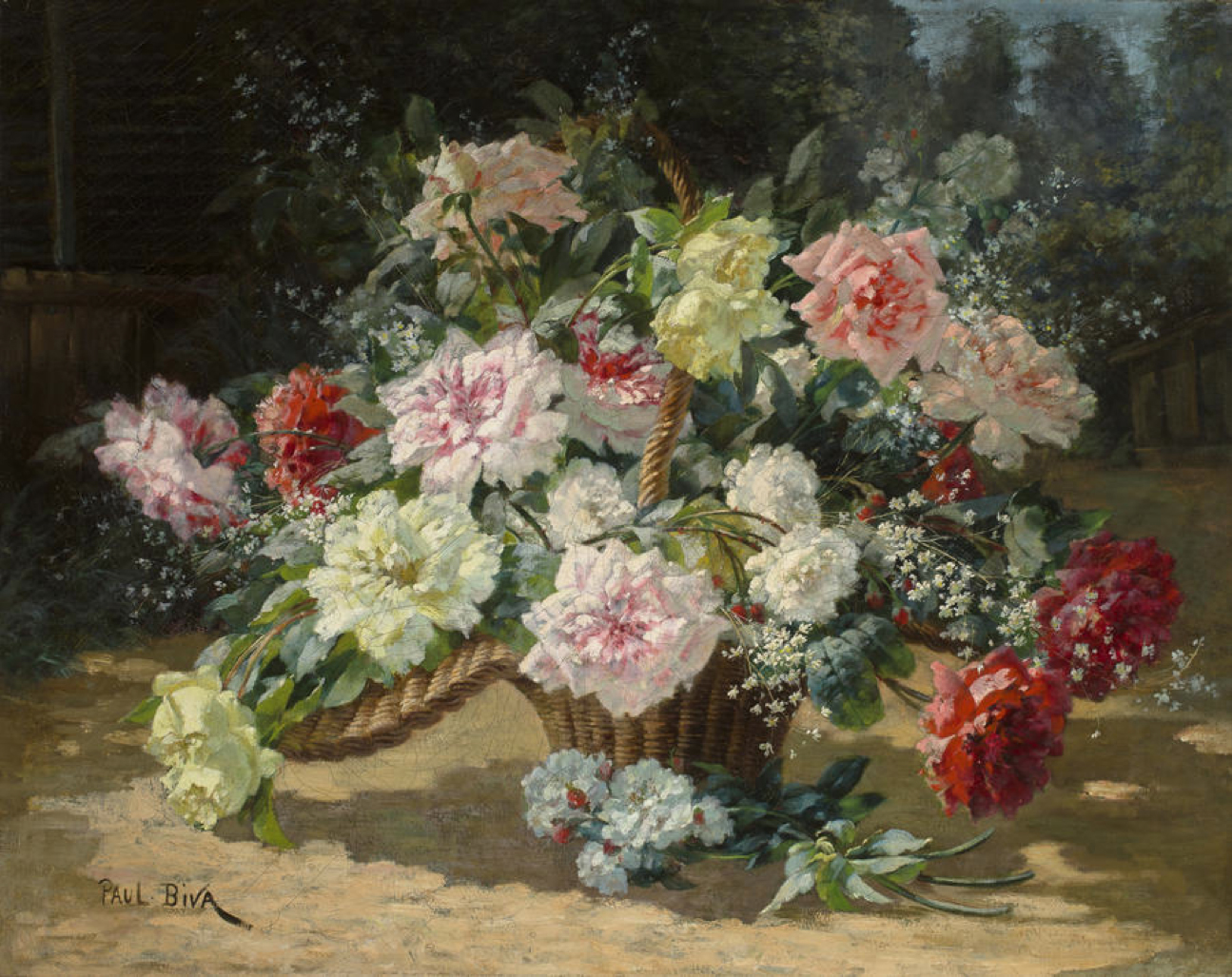
Paul Biva, A basket of roses (Fresh from the garden), oil on canvas, 73.1 x 92.6 cm

From Biva's first exhibition at the Salon des artistes français of 1878 until his death, the works of Paul Biva had been recognized and appreciated by the public and critics, as evidenced by articles commenting on the numerous exhibitions in which he participated.

Whereas his brother Henri Biva focused primarily on landscapes representing the western suburbs of Paris in the plein-air tradition, Paul Biva's favorite subjects were flowers, especially roses and peonies in full bloom. He paid great attention to the subtly nuanced variations of direct and reflected light on flower petals, while using vivid contrasts to highlight the expressive colors of his subject matter.

M. Paul Biva, landscape artist with a particular preference for flowers, was in the genre one of the most skilled and brightest artists of our time; his colorations are always, without ever exceeding the threshold of the natural world, vivid and explosive [éclatantes], and his motifs harmoniously composed [...] many landscapes of always fresh tonality, flowers and fruits, are highly acclaimed and sought after by collectors. (Bulletin des Sociétés artistiques de l’est, 1900)

Aside from his paintings, the illustrative skills of Paul Biva are revealed in his drawings that he realized for the illustrated catalogs of the Salon des artistes français between 1878 and 1901.

== The Biva family ==
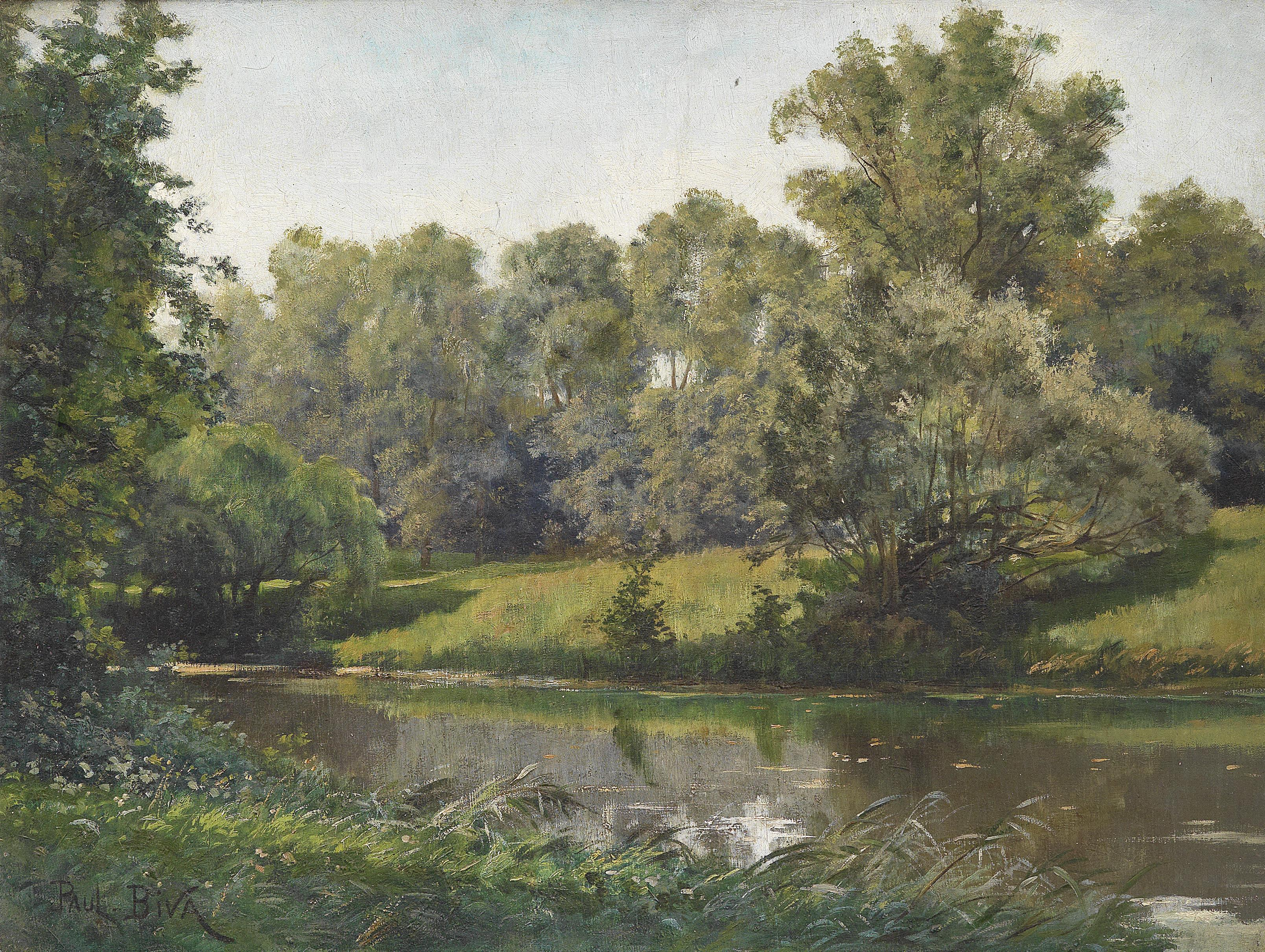
Paul Biva, Paysage (La rivière), oil on canvas, 46 x 61 cm

The literature in the press often confuses the two brothers, Paul's work is sometimes likened to that of Henri Biva, the elder who lived 30 years longer, and whose production was therefore much more abundant. The "Causerie" of Jacques Mauprat, published in Le Progrès Illustré (18 February 1894) mentions 'the flowers of both Biva's' exhibited at the Salon Lyonnais, and in 1993, Élisabeth Hardouin-Fugier and Étienne Grafe, in their book titled Les Peintres de Fleurs en France, de Redouté à Redon repeatedly mention "Biva", without specifying a first name to distinguishing between the two, even though several of their paintings are discussed and reproduced in the ouvrage.

If at first, from 1873, the young Paul Biva was influenced by the zeitgeist for genre scenes and landscapes—electing to paint landscapes that evoke those of Jean-Baptiste Corot—he subsequently explored other paths and other subjects. His flowers became more expressive, vigorous yet delicate and full of freshness, while Henri Biva's landscapes offered an intimate glimpse of a specific locale, characterized by intricate strokes and a pure palette bathed with warm natural light. Both Bivas devoted great attention to light effects.

Paul Biva's wife, Julienne Jouatte, niece of the painter Alphonse Jouatte (1827-1892), exhibited a still-life with fruit (Nature morte aux fruits) at the Salon in 188 Their daughter, Jeanne Biva, a student of Victor Marec and Paul Biva, was in one of the first coeducational classes at École des beaux-arts de Paris in 1897. where she studied under William Bouguereau. She exhibited pastels at the Salon des artistes français in 1908 (Boules de neige), 1910 (Boules de neige et muguet), 1912 (Renoncules) and 1913 (Anémones).

Their granddaughter, Huguette Graux-Berthoux (1917–2003) studied at l'Ecole de dessin of Suzanne and Gigi Coutant, then at the École des beaux-arts de Paris, and exhibited at the Salon des artistes français and in several other Salons in Paris and Province.

The son of Henri Biva, Lucien Biva (1878-1965), also a painter, emigrated to the United States in 1919 where he continued to paint and work as an ornamental designer for textile fabrics and similar articles of manufacture, patenting over 80 designs between 1920 and 1950. He became an American citizen in 1928.

Charles Biva, Henri Biva, Paul Biva, Julienne Jouatte, Lucien Biva and Huguette Berthoux-Graux are mentioned in the Benezit Dictionary of Artists.

== Gallery ==
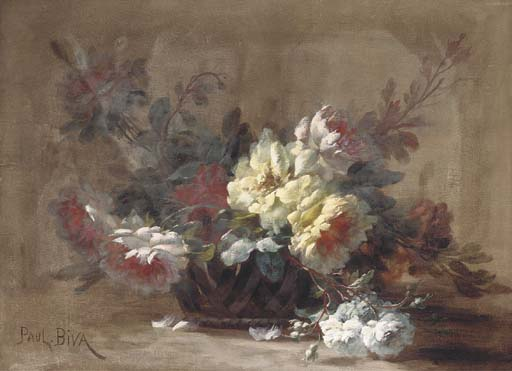
Nature morte (Still life of roses in a cut-glass bowl), oil on canvas, 54.2 × 73.4 cm, private collection

Roses in a vase with a silver casket on a ledge, oil on canvas, 53.3 × 46.3 cm

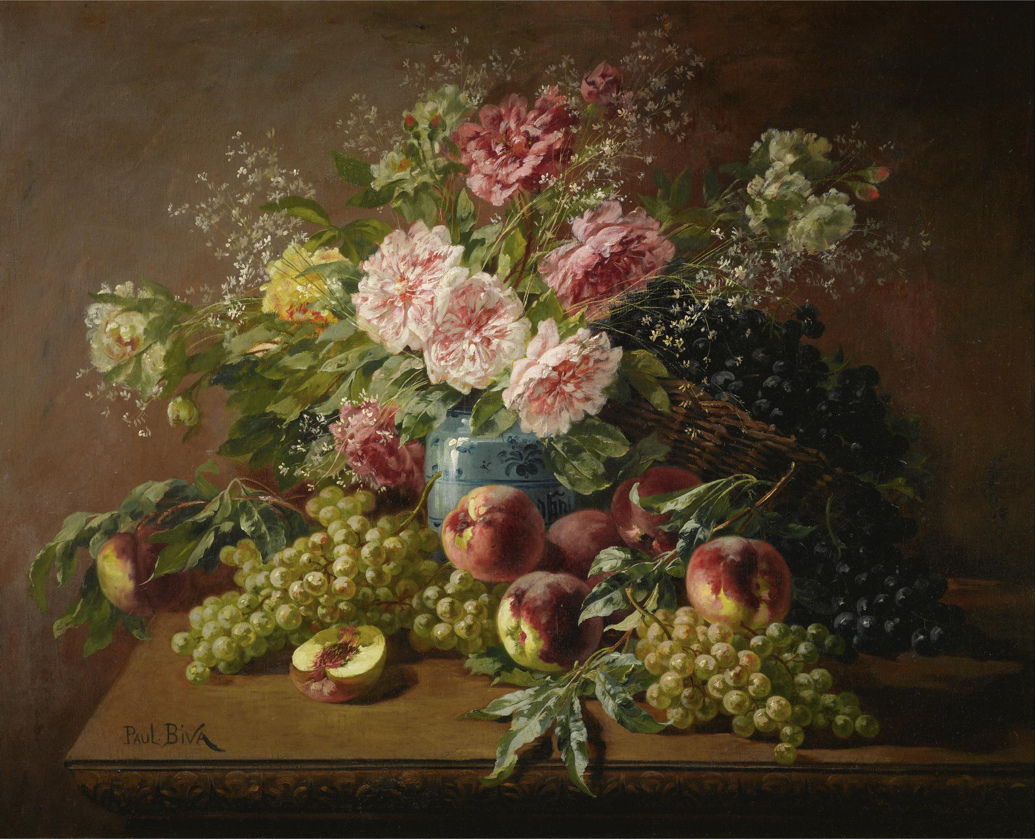
Nature morte avec fleurs, pêches et raisins (Still life with flowers, peaches and grapes), oil on canvas, 91.4 × 73.7 cm

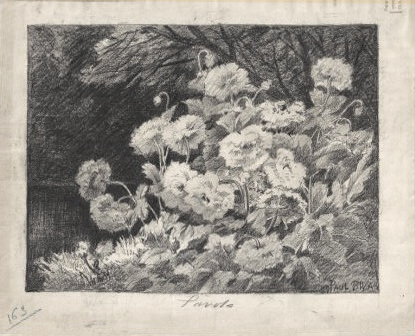
Pavots. Published in the catalogue illustré du Salon des Artistes Français, 1889, private collection

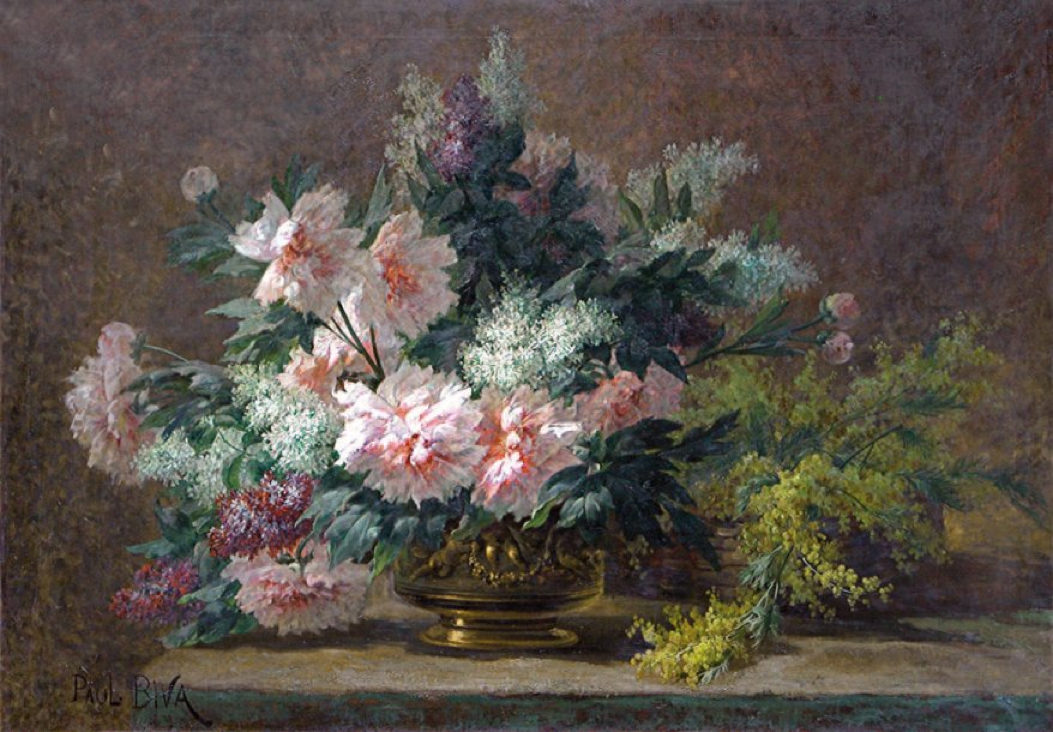
Pivoines et mimosa dans un vase en cuivre, oil on canvas, 114 x 163 cm

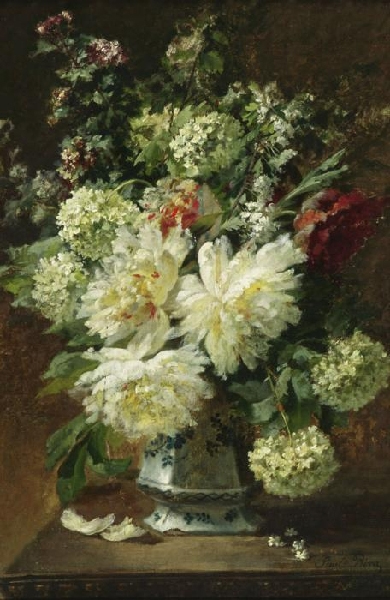
Nature morte avec des fleurs (Blumenstilleben), oil on canvas, 78 × 52.5 cm, private collection

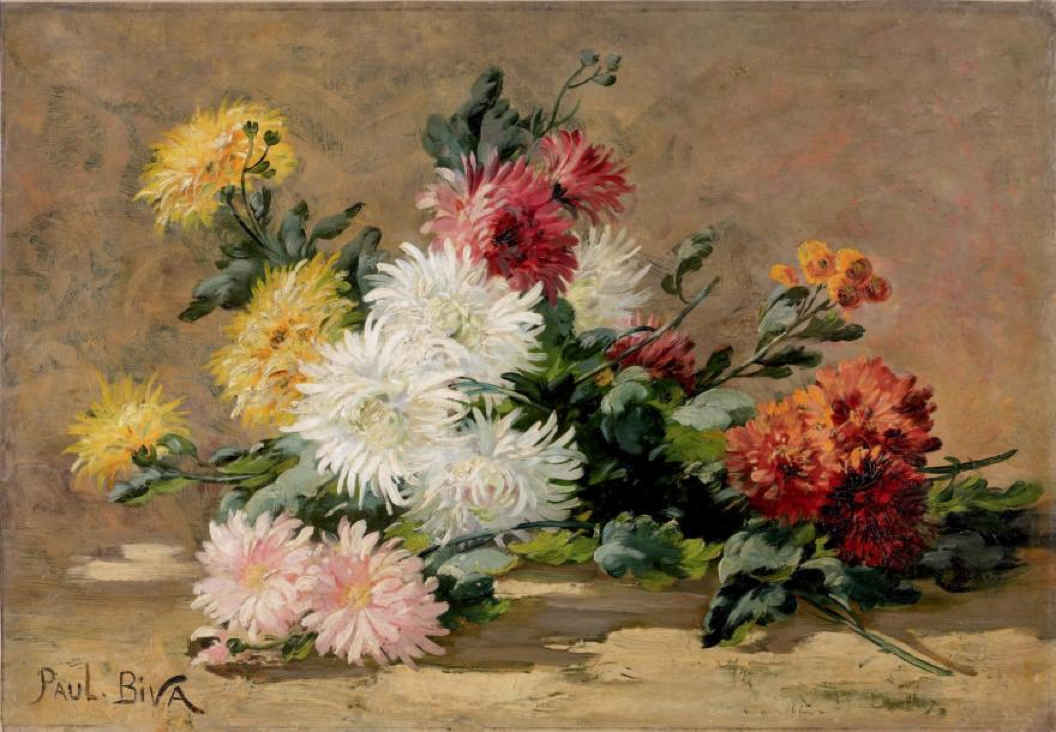
Fleurs, oil on canvas, 38.5 x 55 cm

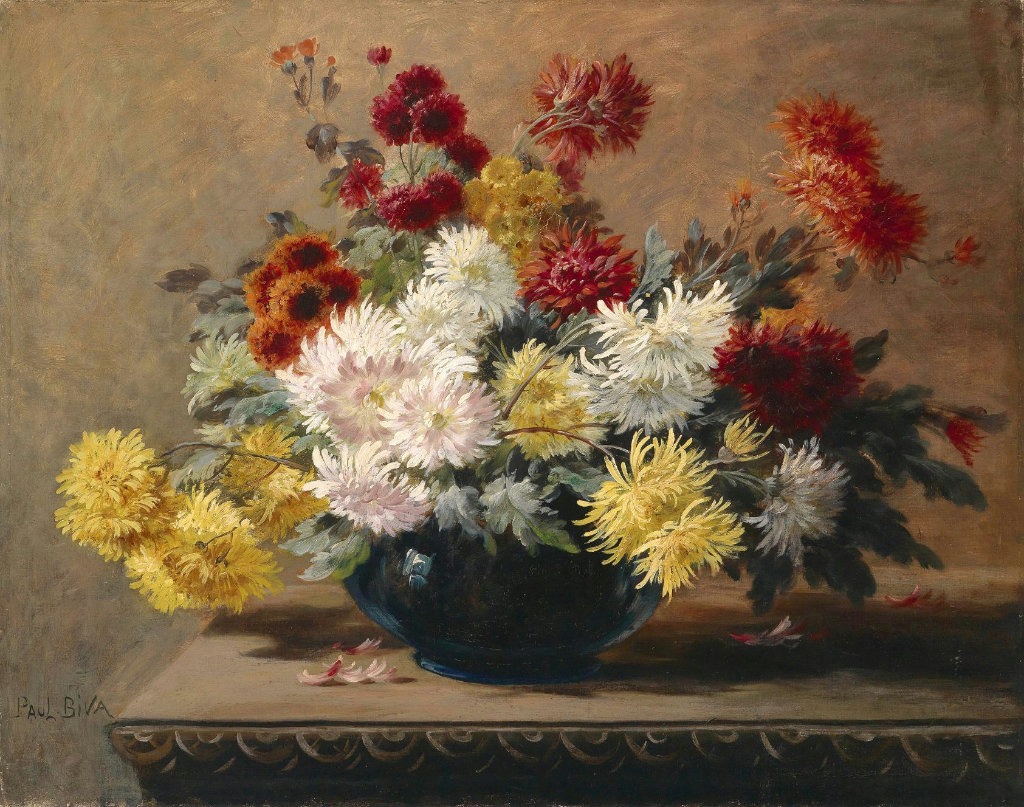
Astern in Vase, oil on canvas, 60 x 74 cm, private collection

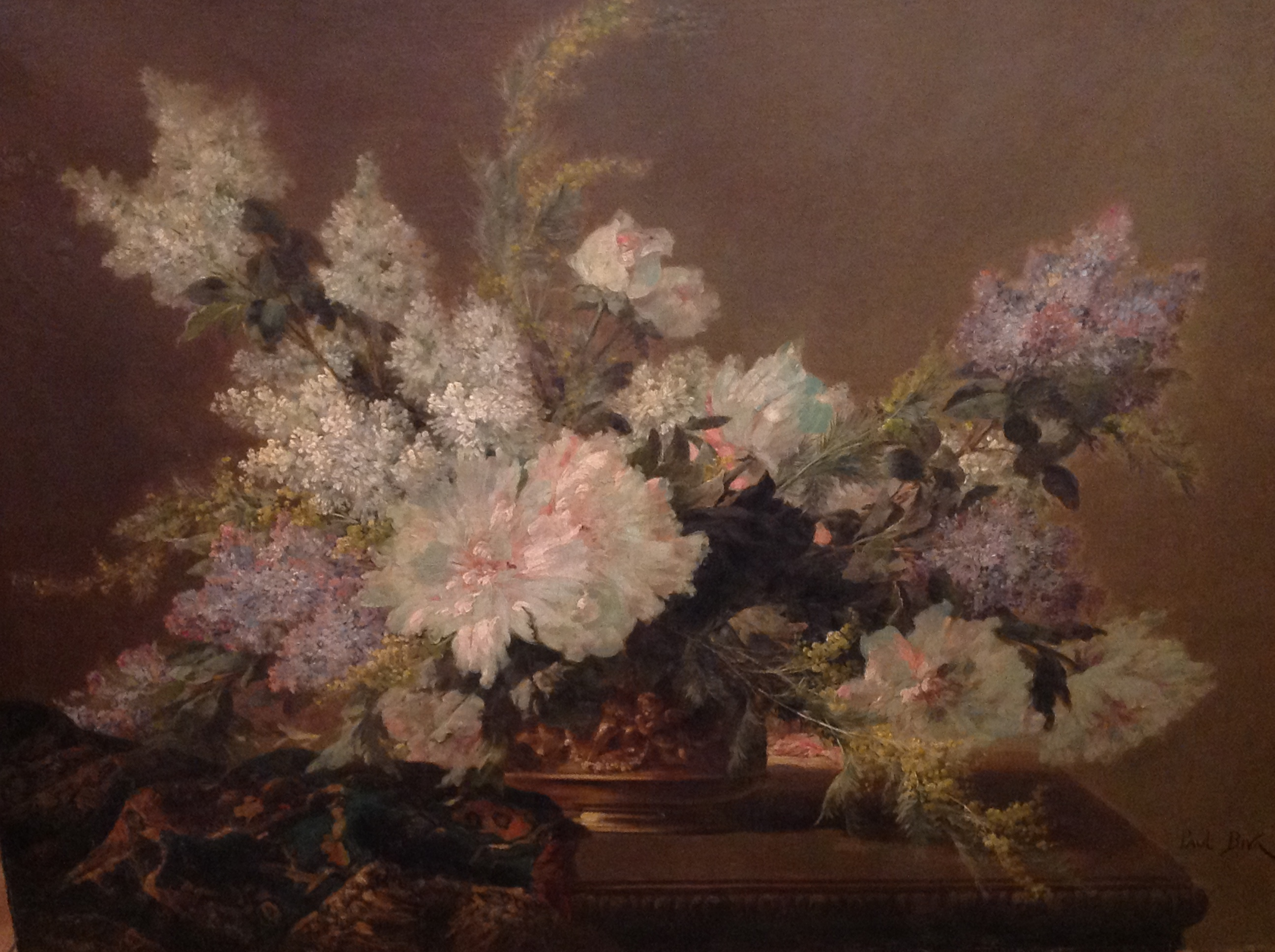
Bouquet de fleurs dans une coupe en bronze sur un entablement, oil on canvas, 114 x 145 cm, private collection

== Public collections ==
- Le matin à Villeneuve l’Étang, before 1873, Musée des beaux-arts de Troyes
- Roses, 1889, Musée Gétraud, Barbezieux-Saint-Hilaire, Charente
- Corbeille de Pivoines, before 1892, Musée d'art et d'histoire de Saint-Brieuc
- Les Roses, Salon de 1896, Musée des Beaux-Arts de Dijon
- Les Pavots, Salon des artistes français, 1898, Musée des beaux-arts et d'archéologie Joseph-Déchelette, Roanne
- Pivoines, Mairie d’Isdes, Loiret

Works by Paul Biva are also conserved at Château de Dieppe, Musée des beaux-arts de Rouen and at Musée des beaux-arts de Tourcoing.

== Salons ==
=== Salon des artistes français ===
- 1878, Le matin à Villeneuve l’Étang
- 1879, Dans le parc, L’Étang de Villeneuve l’Étang, Anémones (gouache)
- 1880, Pensées
- 1881, Fruits, Provisions
- 1883, Fleurs et fruits
- 1884, Dans le parc de Villeneuve l’Étang, le matin
- 1889, Roses
- 1890, Pivoines, Dans la vallée de Brunoy
- 1891, Panier de roses
- 1892, Pivoines
- 1893, Roses, Pavots
- 1894, Porte fleurie, Fleurs de printemps
- 1895, Pavots
- 1896, Roses, Pavots
- 1897, Fleurs de printemps, Pavots
- 1898, Roses trémières, Pavots
- 1899, Fleurs de Printemps, Pavots
- 1900, Floraison d’un matin
- 1901, Pavots au clair de lune

== Bibliography ==
- Le Temps (Paris. 1861). Bibliothèque nationale de France, ISSN 1150-1073 ISSN
- Lyon horticole, Volumes 5-6, Association horticole lyonnaise., 1883
- Chronique de l'art, Librairie de l'art, 1883
- Lyon-revue, Volume 6, 1884, Lyon (France), 1884
- Catalogue illustré du Salon (Société des artistes français), 1884
- L'Artiste, Volume 1, Aux bureaux de L'Artiste., 1890
- Courrier de l'art, Volume 10, Eugène Véron, Paul Leroi, Librairie de l'art, 1890
- Revue des Pyrénées, Volume 3, Université de Toulouse. Conseil de l'université, Association Pyrénéenne, Toulouse, Union des sociétés savantes du Midi, 1891
- L'Art: revue hebdomadaire illustrée, 1894
- L'art: revue mensuelle illustrée, Volume 1, Librairie de l'Art, 1894
- Revue de l'art français ancien et moderne, Volume 11, Société de l'histoire de l'art français Paris, 1894
- La Revue du siècle, littéraire, artistique & scientifique, Volume 10, 1896
- La Revue du siècle, Bureau de la revue, 1896
- Beaux-arts: revue d'information artistique, La Chronique des arts et de la curiosité, supplément à la Gazette des beaux-arts, 1897
- Revue du Nivernais, Volumes 1-2, Beaumont-la-Ferriere, 1897
- Salon de 1898, Société des artistes français. Salon, Société nationale des beaux-arts (France). Salon, Goupil & Cie
- La Quinzaine, 1898, Lyon Public Library
- Bulletin artistique de l'Est: Volumes 5 à 6, 1899-1900
- Jardins de France, Société nationale d'horticulture de France, 1900
- Actes de l'Académie nationale des sciences, belles-lettres et arts de Bordeaux, Hotel des sociétés savantes, 1901
- Actes, Académie nationale des sciences, belles-lettres et arts de Bordeaux, 1901
- Le salon, dix ans de peinture, Gustave Haller, C. Lévy, 1902
- Journal des débats politiques et littéraires, 1814-1944, ISSN 1770-619X
- Maîtres et petits Maîtres du XIXe siècle, Galerie René Drouin, Le Chemin en campagne, Paris, October 1942
- Emmanuel Bénézit, Dictionnaire des peintres, sculpteurs, dessinateurs et graveurs, Vol. 2, p. 356
- Elisabeth Hardouin-Fugier, Etienne Grafe, Peintres de Fleurs en France, de Redouté à Redon, Les Éditions de l’Amateur, 1993, pp. 177, 199, 240, 248, 304, 315, 349
- Lydia Harambourg, Dictionnaire des peintres paysagistes français du XIX° siècle, Ides et Calendes, 1985, p. 60
- Jean Yves Ribault, Mécènes et collectionneurs, Volume 1, Comité des travaux historiques et scientifiques, Éditions du CTHS, 1999, ISBN 2735504050
