= Henri Biva =

French painter

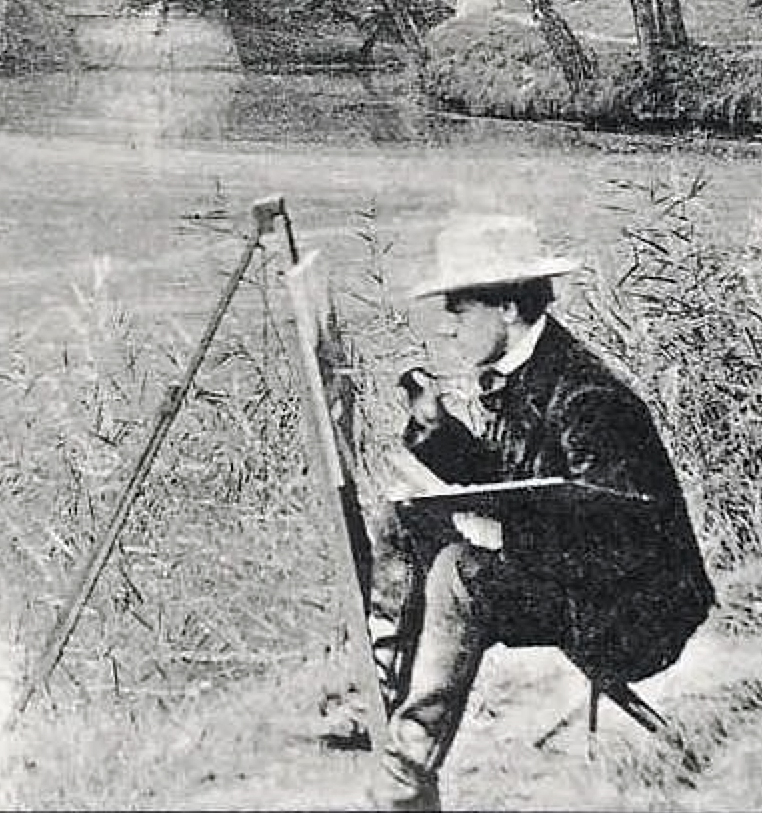
- 1903, Villeneuve-l'Etang
- Born: Henri Biva; 22 January 1848; Paris, France
- Died: 2 February 1929 (aged 81); Paris, France
- Known for: Painting
- Notable work: Les brumes, Villeneuve-l'Etang (Musée du Luxembourg), A woodland pond, By the river, Les Nénuphars, From the water's edge, Une rue de Ville d'Avray (Street in Ville d'Avray), The waterfall
- Movement: Realism, Naturalism, Luminism
- Awards: Chevalier of the Legion of Honour

Henri Biva (23 January 1848 – 2 February 1929) was a French artist, known for his landscape paintings and still lifes. He focused primarily on the western suburbs of Paris, painting outdoors in the plein-air tradition; his style ranged between Post-Impressionism and Realism with a strong Naturalist component. Biva's pictures are characterized by intricate strokes and a pure palette bathed with warm natural light (Biva devoted great attention to light effects). The artist was a member of the Société des Artistes Français and a Knight of the Legion of Honour (Chevalier de la Légion d'Honneur).

== Early life ==
Henri Biva was born in Montmartre at 18 rue du Vieux Chemin de Paris (named rue Ravignan after 1867). His official date of birth is 22 January 1848. He grew up in an artistic environment, both within his own family and in the neighborhood in which he lived. His younger brother Paul Biva (1851–1900) also became a painter, as would Henri Biva's son Lucien Biva (1878–1965).

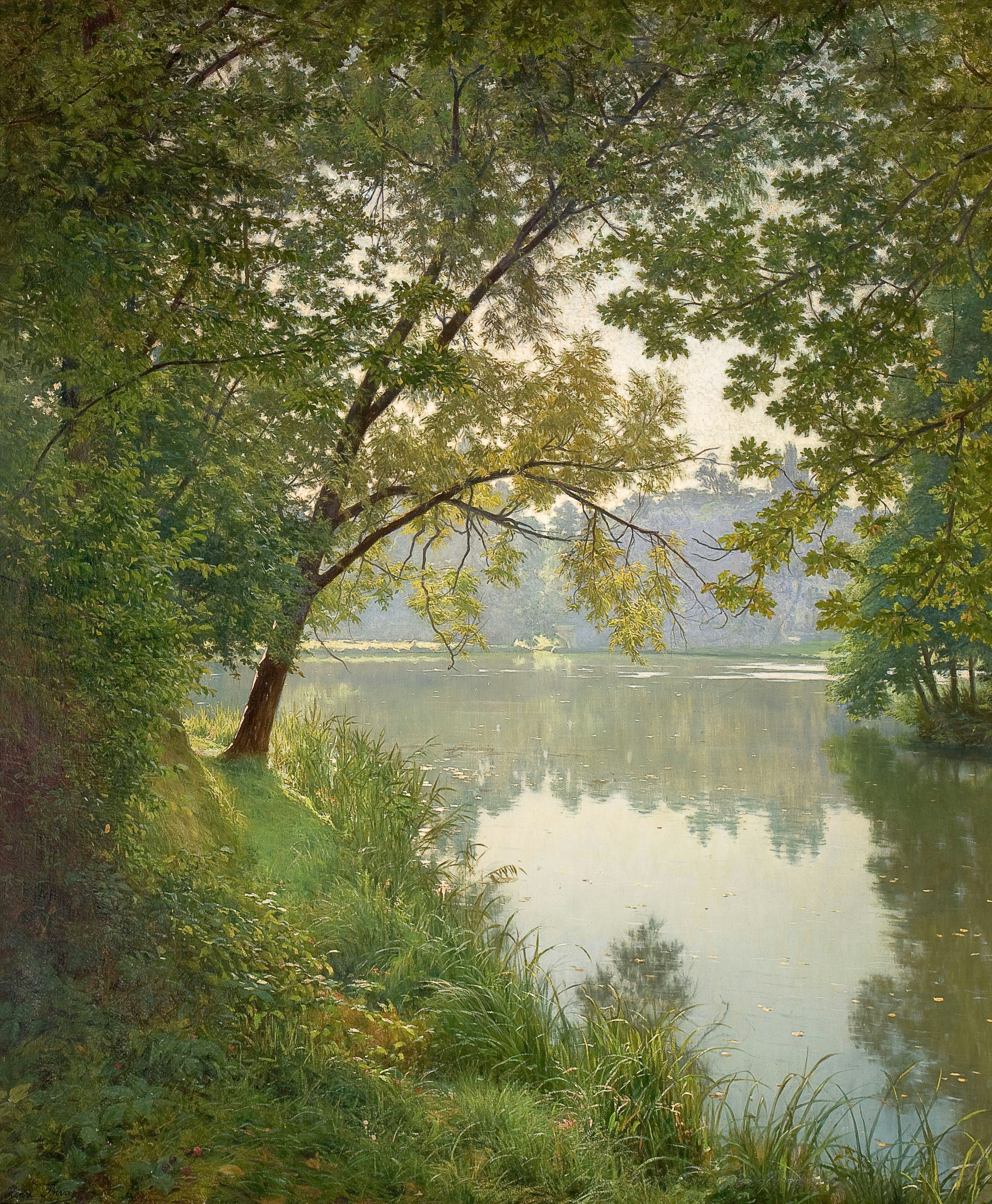
Henri Biva, ca 1905–06, Matin à Villeneuve (From Waters Edge), oil on canvas, 153.7 x 127 cm (60.5 x 50 in), painted at Villeneuve l'Etang, Marnes-la-Coquette (Seine-et-Oise), France, private collection

In 1873 Biva studied at the École des Beaux-Arts in Paris, where many famous artists in Europe were trained. His teachers included Léon Tanzi (1846–1913), an esteemed Realist painter, and Alexandre Nozal (1852–1929) a respected landscape artist that perambulated from Impressionism to Post-Impressionism. A trace of both instructors can be contemplated in Biva's work. This, in addition to the lessons at l'Académie Julian with William-Adolphe Bouguereau, Jean-Joseph Benjamin-Constant and Jules Joseph Lefebvre, would ultimately propel Henri Biva to the fore as a career artist. These combined influences explain the skillfully controlled artistry of Henri Biva. The Académie had a very strict and rigorous philosophy toward paintings, yet throughout its history many artists that studied there from 1868 onwards had initiated new artistic movements, or were involved to some extent within them, as was the case of Biva.

Shortly thereafter, during the latter half of the 1870s, Henri Biva began showing his works in the Parisian salon's, while enjoying sufficient commercial success to make his living.

== Painting career ==
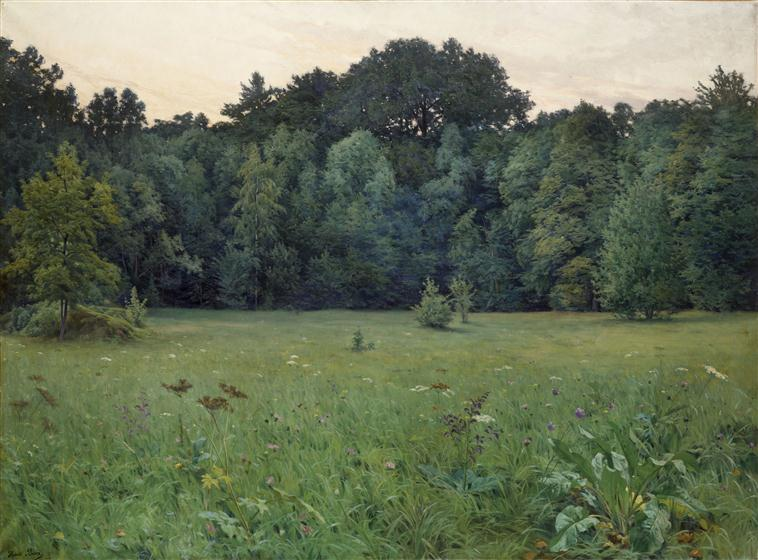
Henri Biva, 1901, Après le coucher du soleil, oil on canvas, 142.5 x 193 cm, Musée Baron-Gérard (MAHB)

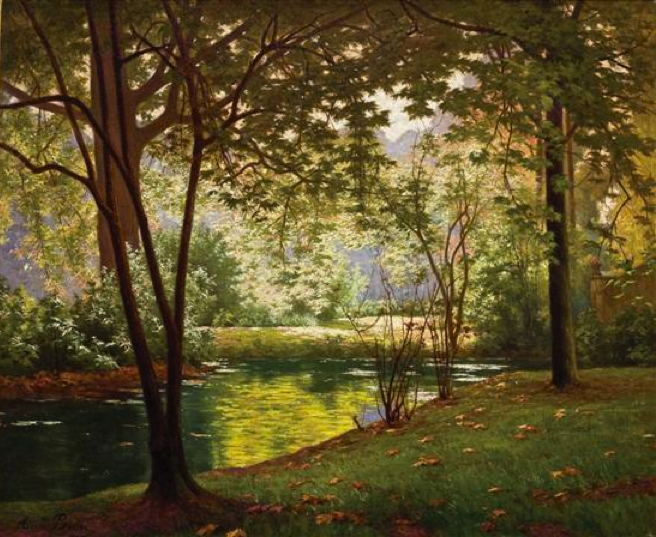
Henri Biva, Bord de rivière ensoleillé, oil on canvas, 53.3 x 59.7 cm

At the Salon de 1879 (which opened on 12 May in Paris at the Palais des Champs-Élysées) Biva exhibited two paintings: Les roses du parc and Pavillon d'été du Chateau de Villeneuve-l'Étang, numbers 293 and 294 in the catalogue.

Janet Whitmore writes of Biva's work, something that could apply to many of his paintings:

"Like the naturalist painters such as Jules Bastien-Lepage or Rosa Bonheur, there is a strong tactile quality to Biva's work, focused on the shapes, colors and forms of the small plants beside the stream or the smooth grey surface of the tree trunks.

Equally important in the nineteenth-century marketplace, this type of landscape painting offered an intimate glimpse of a specific locale, a reminder of days spent in the French countryside, or perhaps at the immense forest preserves surrounding Paris. Unlike contemporaries such as Pissarro or Monet, Biva's landscapes suggest a time before industrialization when no railroad or factory disrupted rural vistas. Rather, these images show no evidence of human activity at all except for the occasional fisherman drowsing by the riverside."

With his style ranging between Post-Impressionism and Realism, with a pronounced Naturalist temperament—visible in Villeneuve-l'étang (soir) and Après le coucher du soleil—the paintings of Henri Biva gained in popularity amongst private collectors and public institutions.

"Although Biva's career seems to have flourished during the 1880s," writes Janet Whitmore, "he received particular acclaim in the 1890s beginning with his first honorable mention at the Salon des Artistes Français in 1892 when his work as a painter of landscapes and flowers was especially noted. Three years later, in 1895, he received a third class medal, and in 1896, a second class medal. With this third award in place, he was no longer obligated to submit his work to the annual jury for acceptance, but instead was guaranteed an automatic position at the Salon."

"The turn of the century brought Biva continued success and public renown. His landscapes and flower paintings, still widely sought after by art collectors, gradually evolved into more meditative images."

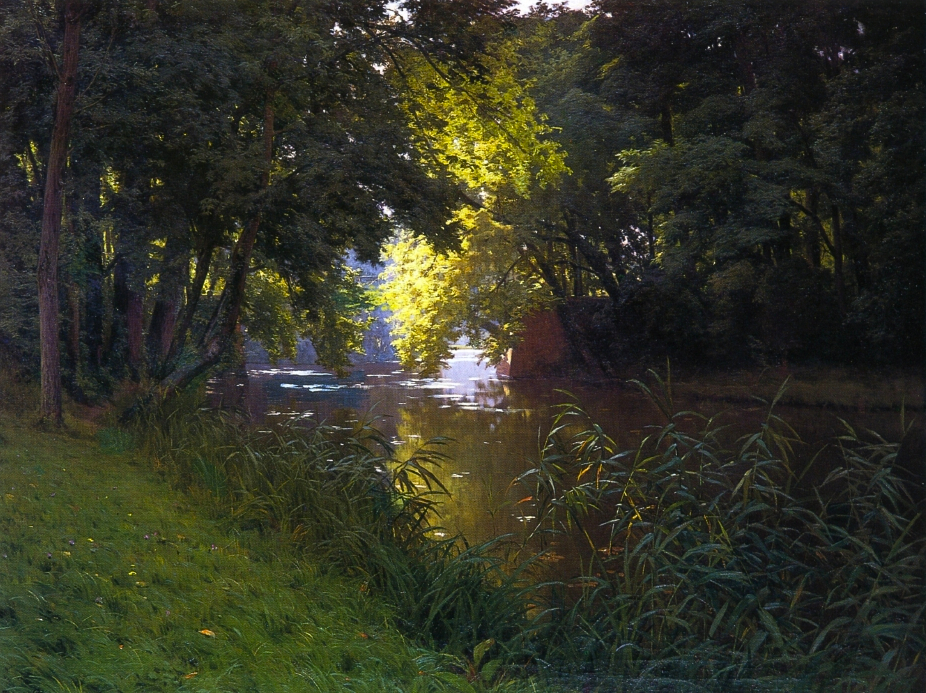
Henri Biva, By the river, oil on canvas, 122 x 162 cm

In 1886 Biva exhibited three works, including Une rue de Ville-d'Avray, La Nuit, at the Exposition Internationale de Blanc et Noir (Louvre, Pavillon de l'enseignement, Rue des Tuileries, Paris, 20 March-20 April 1886). Biva's was awarded the Médaille de bronze at the Exposition Universelle (1900), inviting the attention of the Purchasing Committee, while his teacher Alexandre Nozal was awarded the silver medal.

Upon recommendation of Le Ministre de l'Instruction Publique et des Beaux-Arts, 11 August 1900, Biva was decorated Chevalier de l'Ordre de la Légion d'Honneur, 29 November 1900, and breveted by the Grand Chancelier, 12 December of the same year.

This honorable accomplishment appears to have stimulated further commercial success in the years leading up to World War I. Following the war years, Biva's sales rebounded as he continued exhibiting paintings throughout the 1920s.

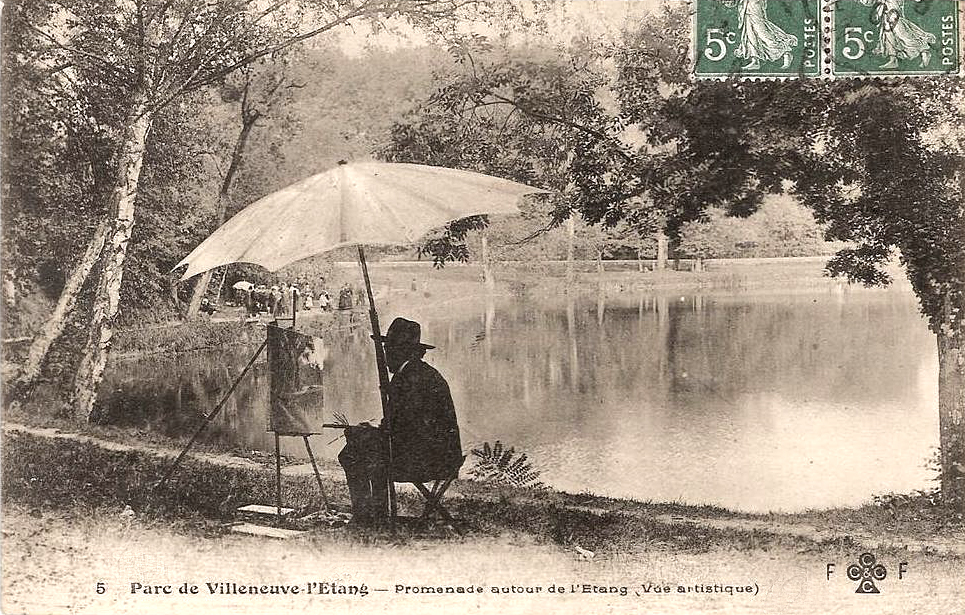
The artist painting at Villeneuve-l'Etang circa 1909, Marnes-la-Coquette (Seine-et-Oise), France

Biva exhibited his painting in the Salons des Artistes Francais, Paris, in 1900, 1903, 1904 and 1905. In 1923 Henri Biva was elected vice-president of the Salon d'Hiver (Winter Salon), founded in 1897, first exhibition 1904.

Biva continued to show regularly in Paris, with a conspicuous break during World War I (most of the Salons being closed for the duration 1914–1918). Some of Biva's documented exhibitions include: Salon 1905, Salon 1906, Salon 1908 (Société Lyonnaise des Beaux-Arts), Salon 1909, Salon des Artistes Français 1910, Salon d'Hiver 1910, Salon 1911, Salon d'Hiver 1911, Salon des Artistes Français 1912, Salon 1919, Salon 1921, Salon d'Hiver 1923, Le Salon 1928 Grand Palais des Champs-Elysées, Société des Artistes Français (the year before his death).

According to his death certificate (avis de décès), Biva died 2 February 1929 at his home in Paris, 72 rue du Château-d'Eau. (Note: The date of death for Biva of 1928 found ubiquitously on the Internet is erroneous. As his death certificate testifies, he actually died in 1929.)

=== Selected works ===
- Matin à Villeneuve (From Waters Edge), 151.1 x 125.1 cm
- The woodland Pool, 155 x 129.5 cm
- Près de la rivière, 122 x 162 cm
- Au bord de la rivière ensoleillé (By the river), 53.3 x 59.7 cm
- Un coin tranquille, 50 x 61 cm
- Le Matin dans la brume à Villeneuve-l'Etang
- Après le coucher du soleil, 142.5 x 193 cm
- Les brumes et rosées du matin Villeneuve l'étang
- A woodland pond, 110.4 x 140.3 cm
- A Summer's day on the lake, 46.3 x 55.3 cm
- Attributed to Henri Biva, Fishing on a sunny afternoon, 100.4 x 77.5 cm
- Punts moored on still waters, 61 x 50 cm
- Paysage avec rivière, 50 x 61 cm
- A sun drenched river view, 64.8 x 54 cm
- Tranquility, 61 by 74 cm
- A woodland pond, 50.2 x 61 cm
- Au bord du lac, 65 x 81 cm
- La rivière, 61.5 x 50.5 cm
- The quite lake, 65.5 x 82 cm
- Rivière en sous bois, 61 x 50.5 cm
- Les nénuphars, 82 x 65 cm
- Paysage de rivière, 66 x 54 cm
- L'allée fleurie, 72.4 x 92.1 cm
- Summer on the river bank, 46 x 34 cm
- Lake scene, 60 x 73 cm

=== Gallery ===
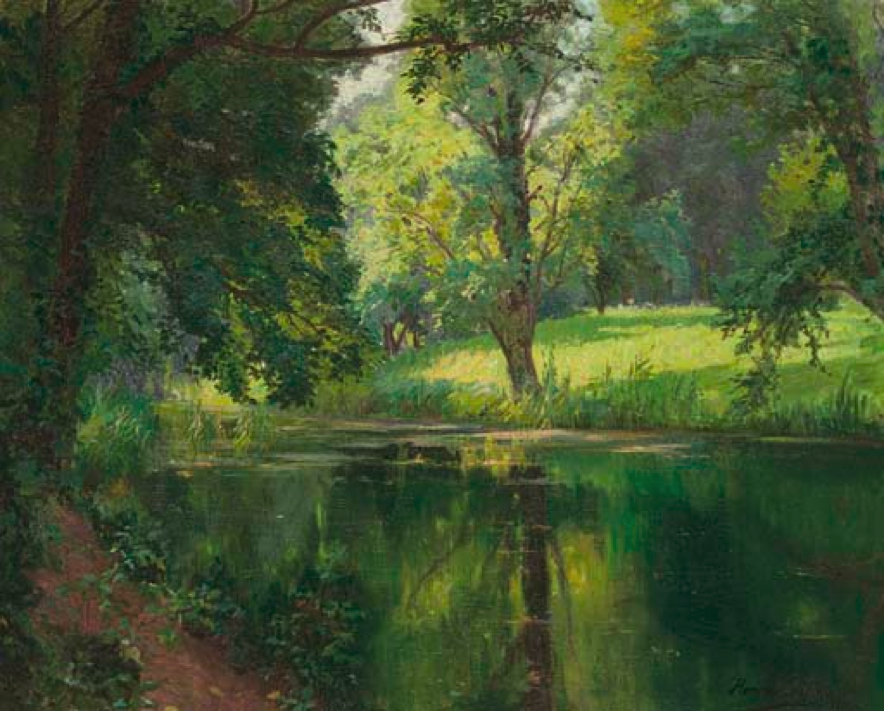
Henri Biva, A quiet stretch of the river, signed Henri Biva (lower right), oil on canvas, 50 by 61 cm

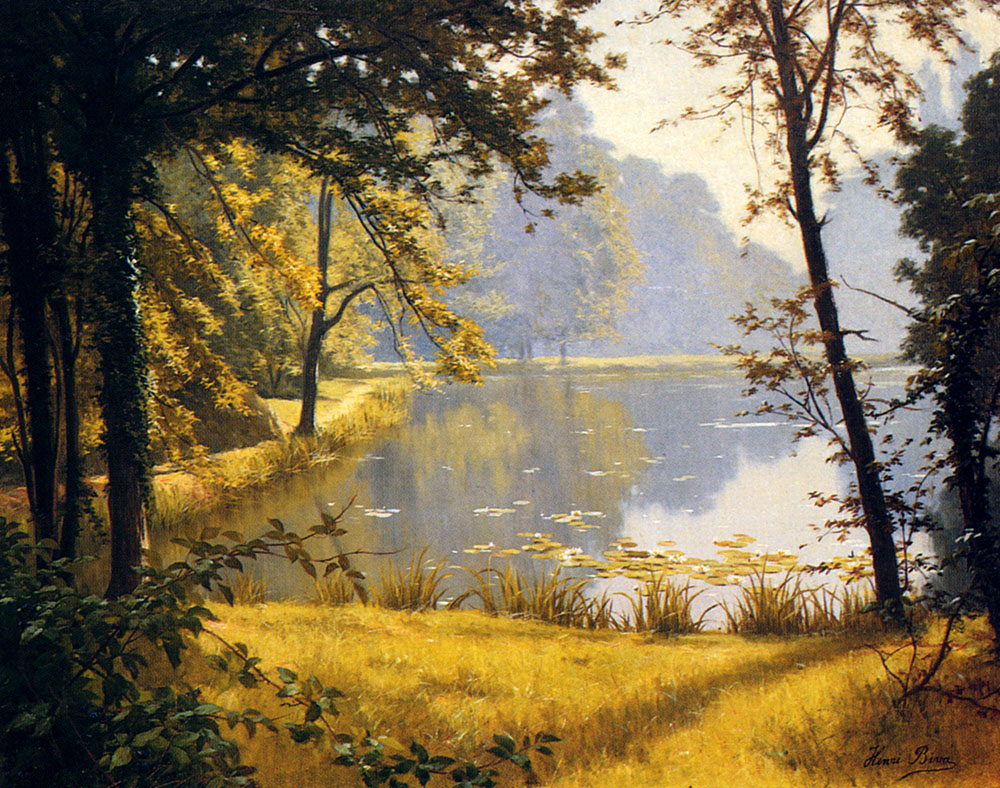
Henri Biva, A Lily Pond, oil on canvas, 91.4 x 73.7 cm (36 x 29 in), private collection

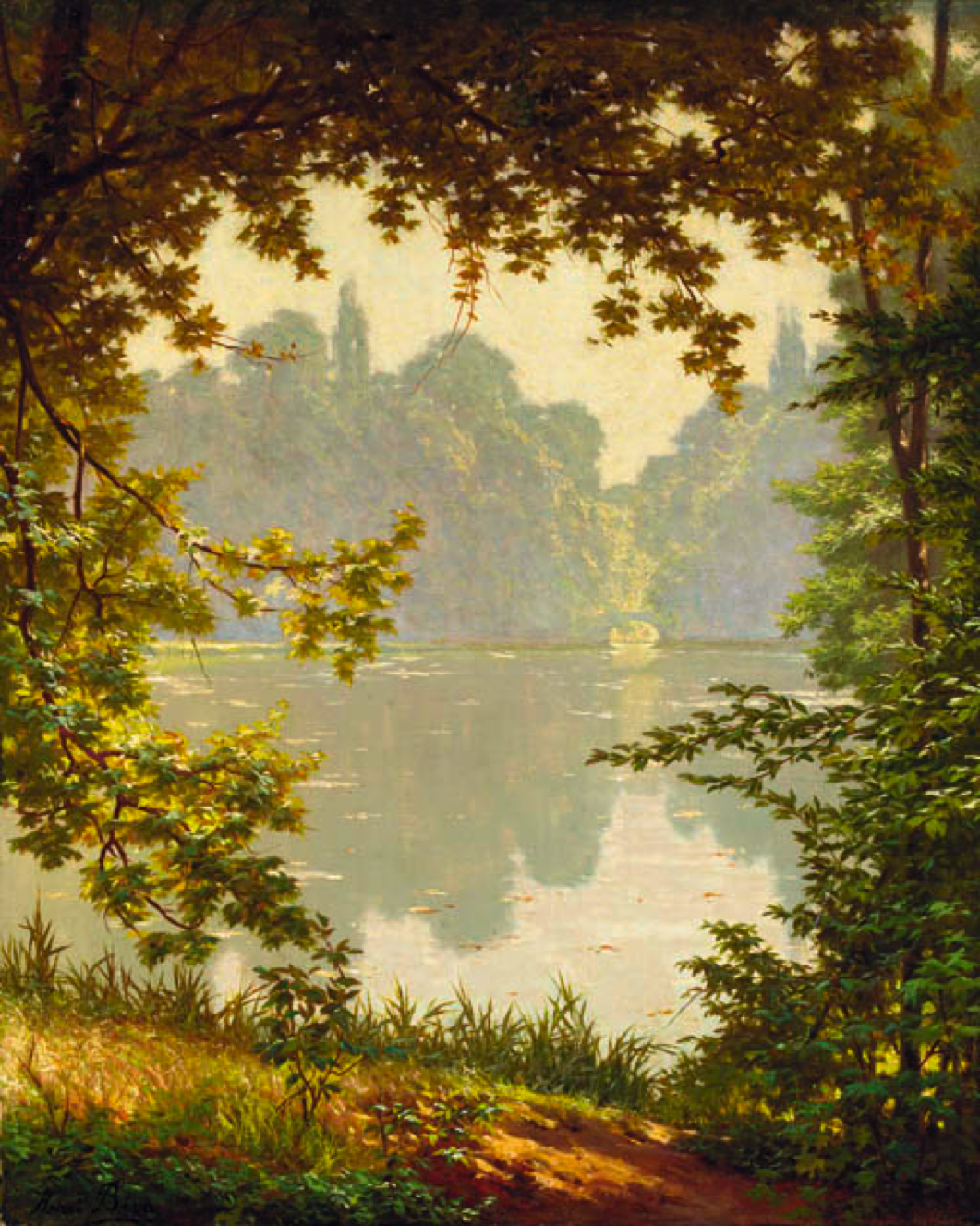
Henri Biva, Looking out onto a lake on a summer day, oil on canvas, 73 x 60.3 cm

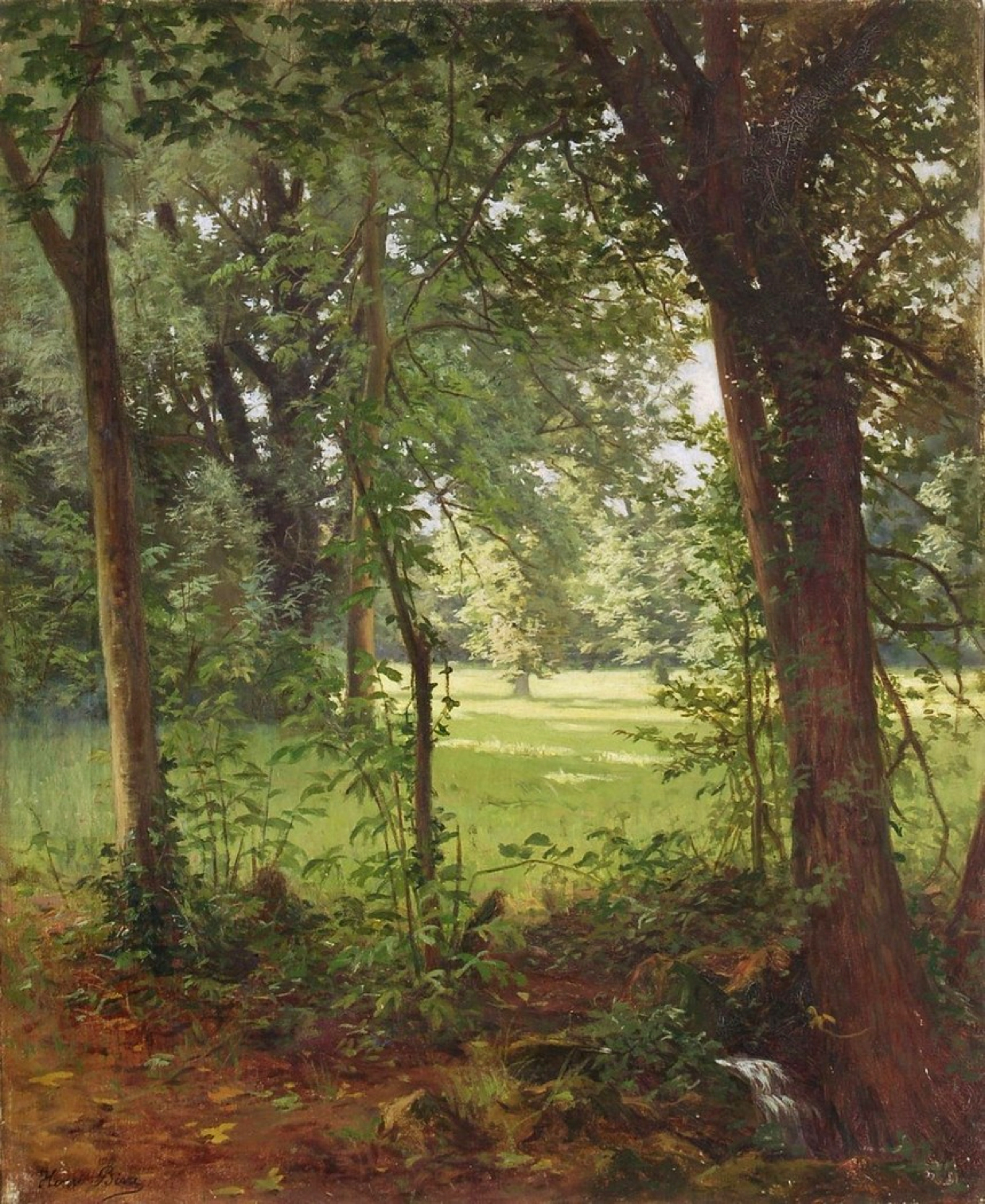
Henri Biva, Forest in the spring, oil on canvas, 73 x 60 cm

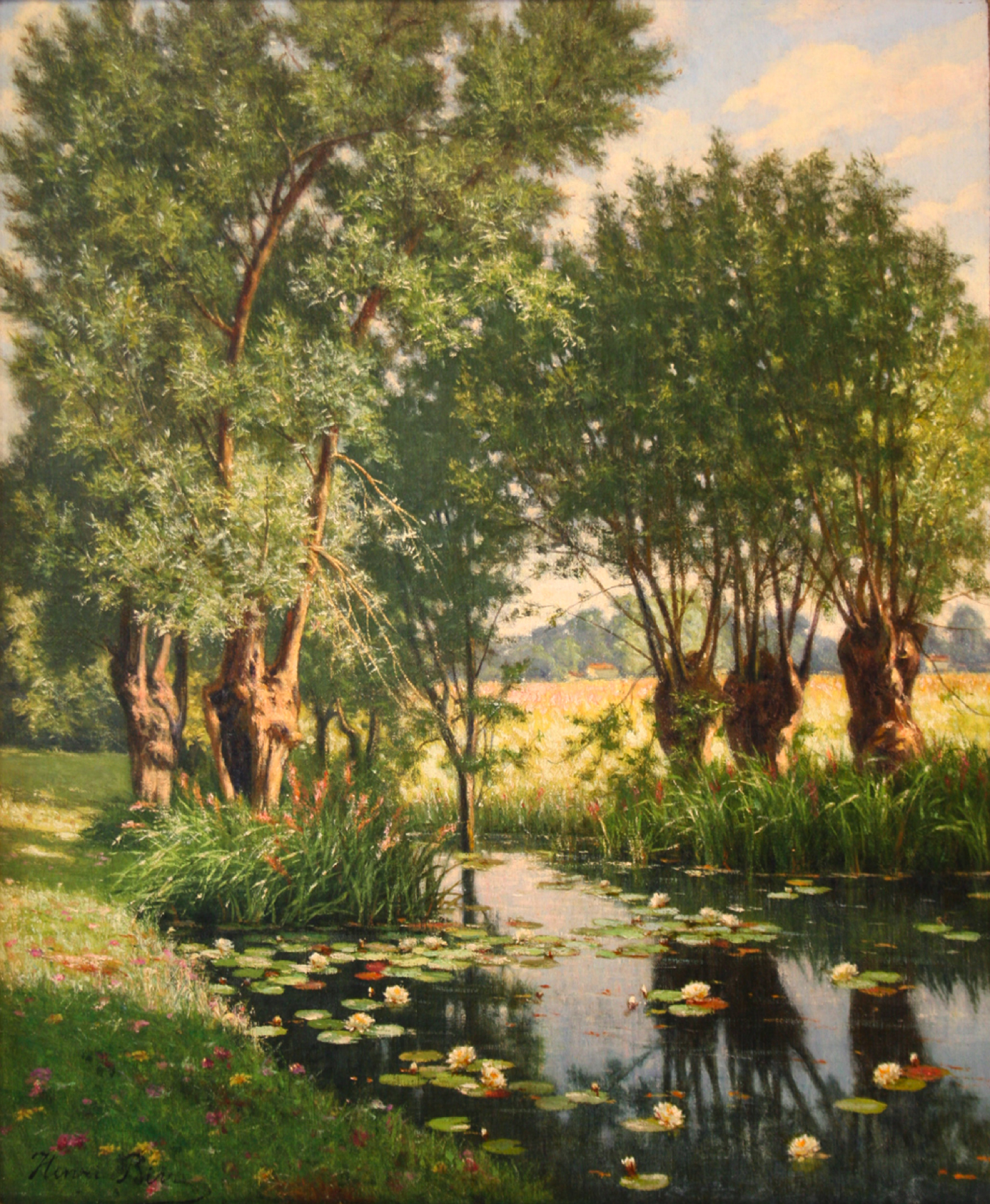
Henri Biva, River Scene in Spring, France (View of Willow Trees on the Bank of a River with Waterlilies), oil on canvas, approx 60 x 49 cm

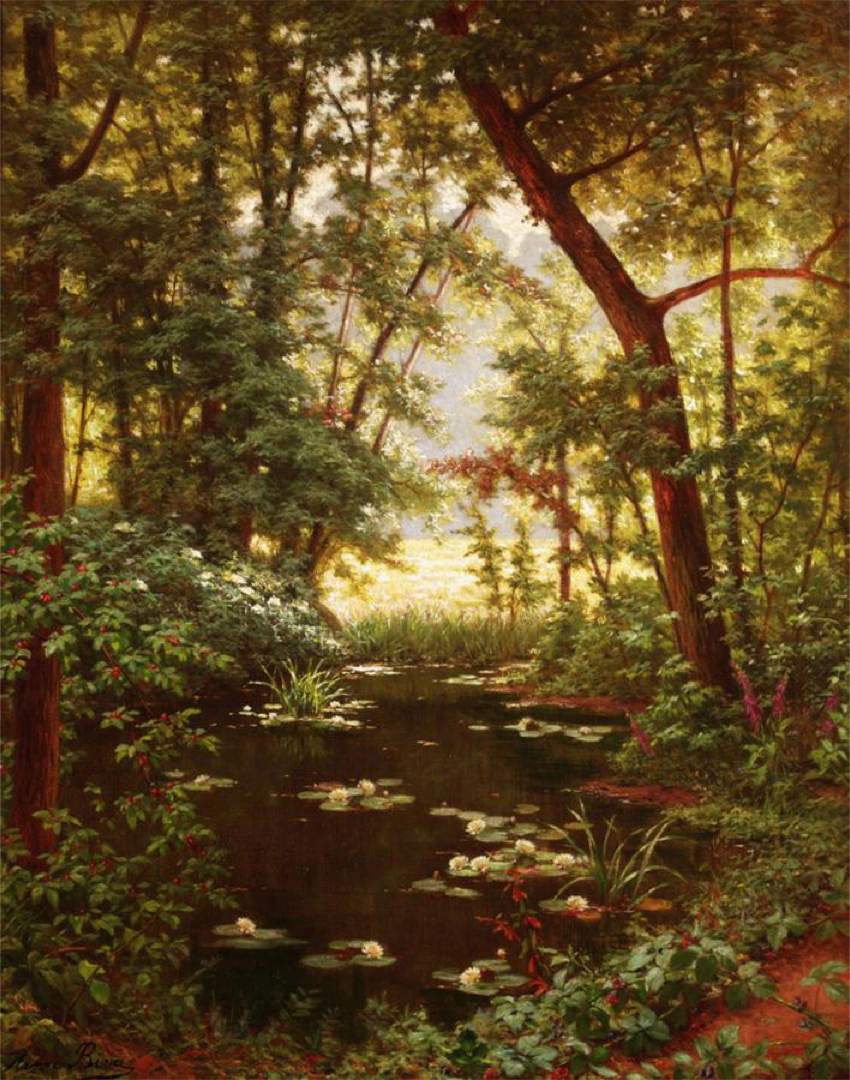
Henri Biva, Les Nénuphar, oil on canvas, 82 x 65 cm

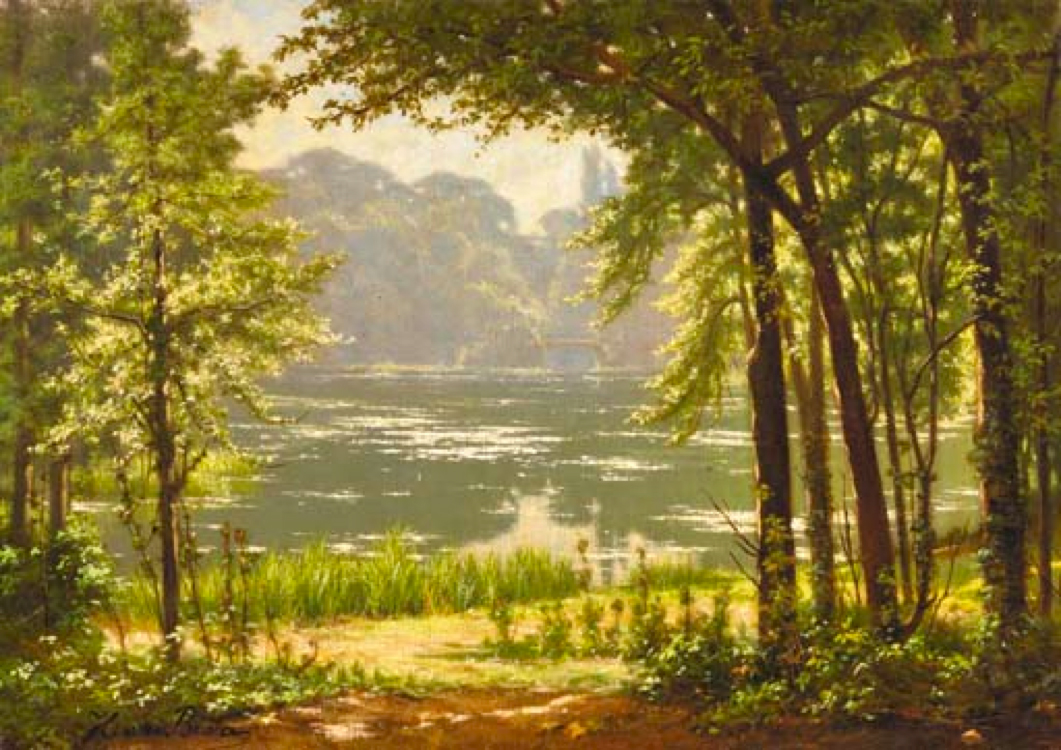
Henri Biva, A sun drenched river view, oil on canvas, 46 x 65.1 cm

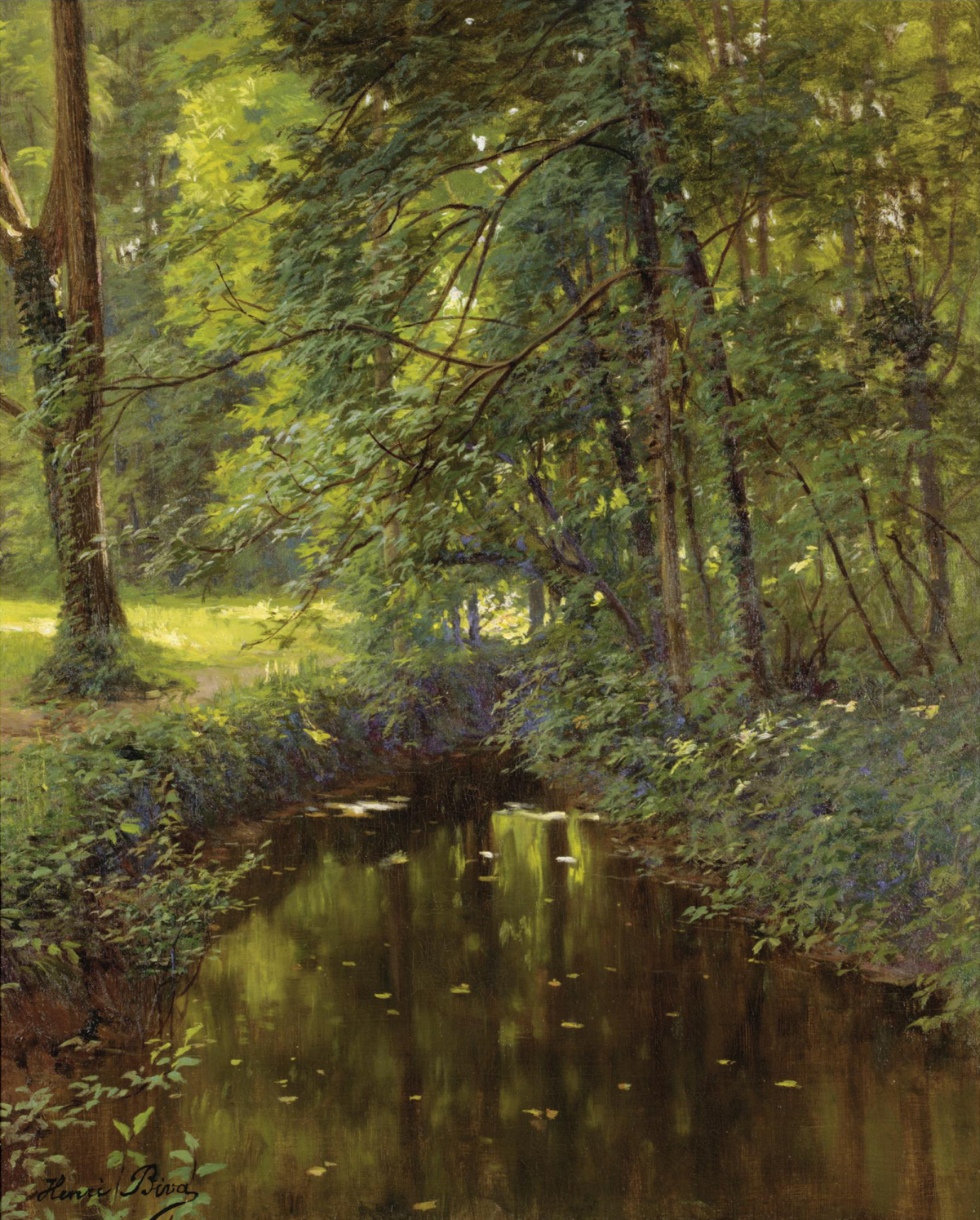
Henri Biva, La Rivère, oil on canvas, 61.5 x 50.5 cm

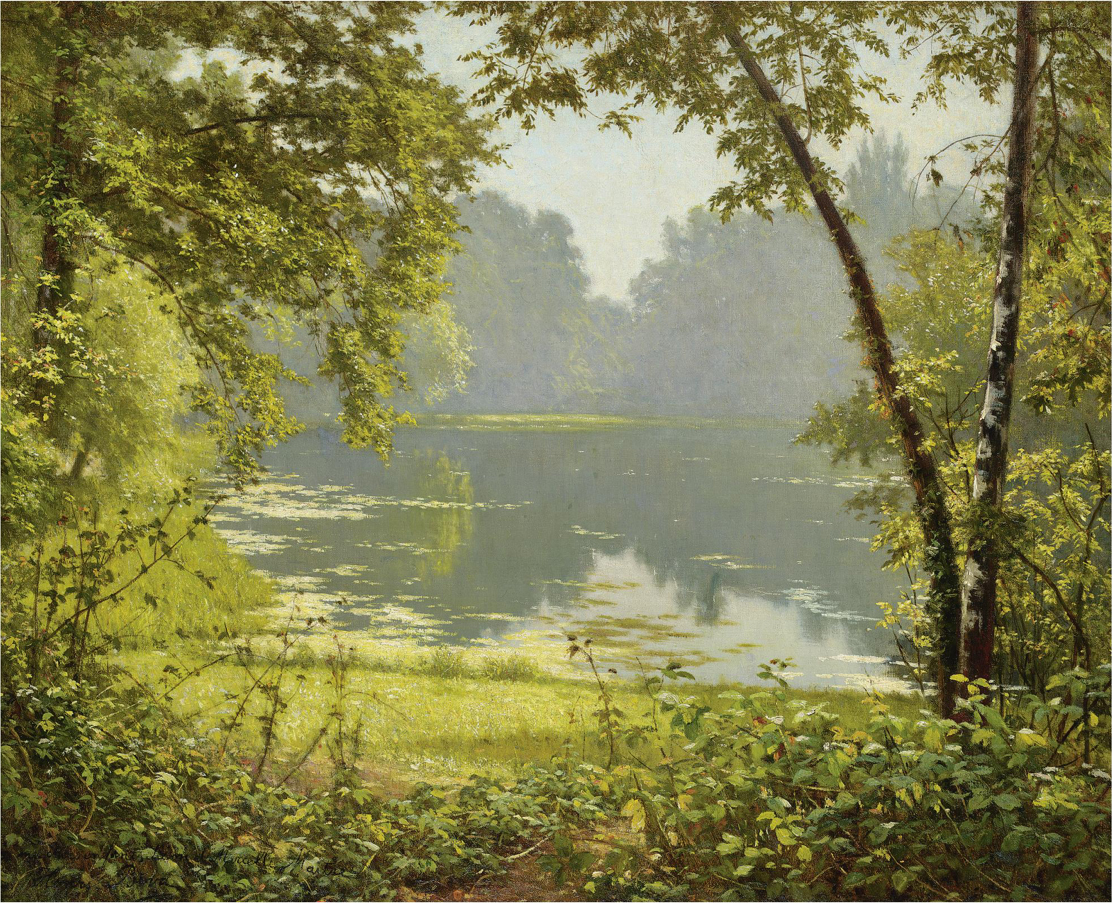
Henri Biva, Tranquility, oil on canvas, 61 x 74 cm, Signed and dedicated "a mes chers enfants Lison et Marcelle Maitre, Henri Biva"

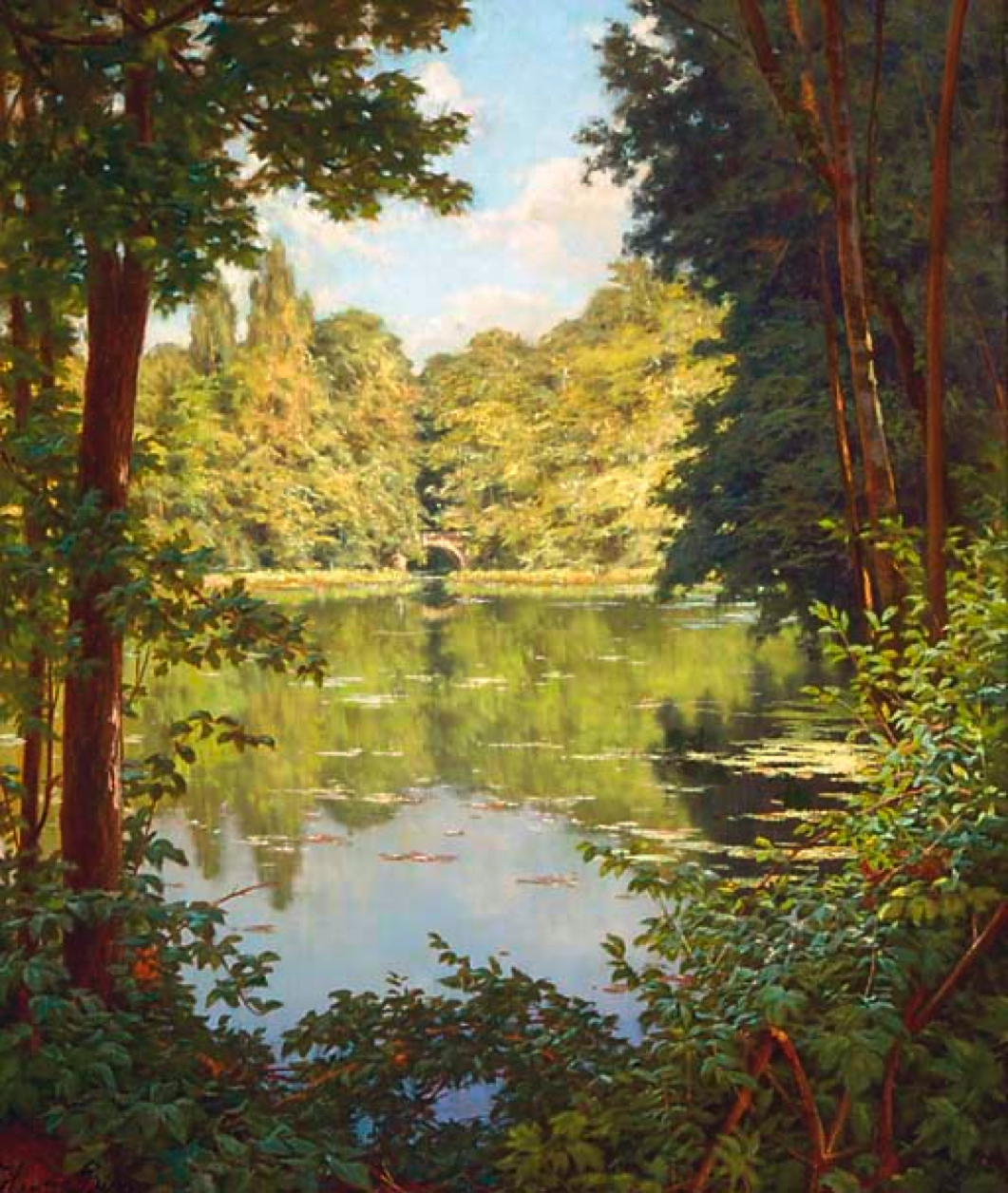
Henri Biva, A sun drenched river view, oil on canvas, 64.8 x 54 cm

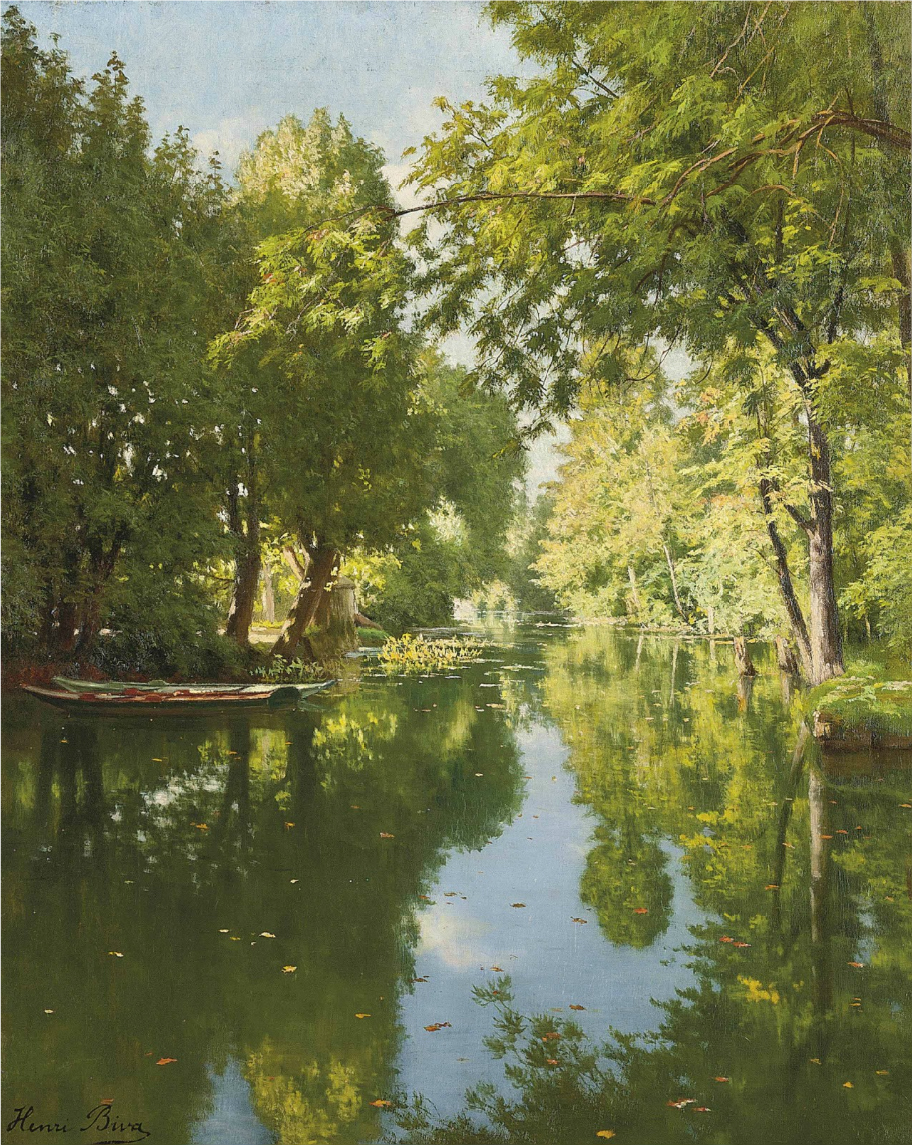
Henri Biva, Punts moored on still waters, oil on canvas, 61 x 50 cm

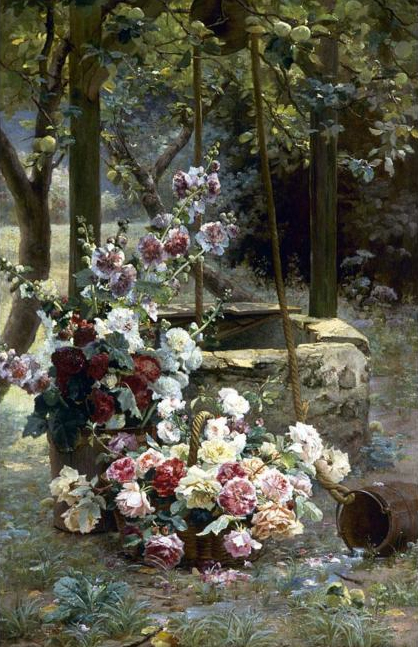
Henri Biva, Fleurs près d'un puits, oil on canvas, 181 x 118.1 (71.25 x 46.5 in)

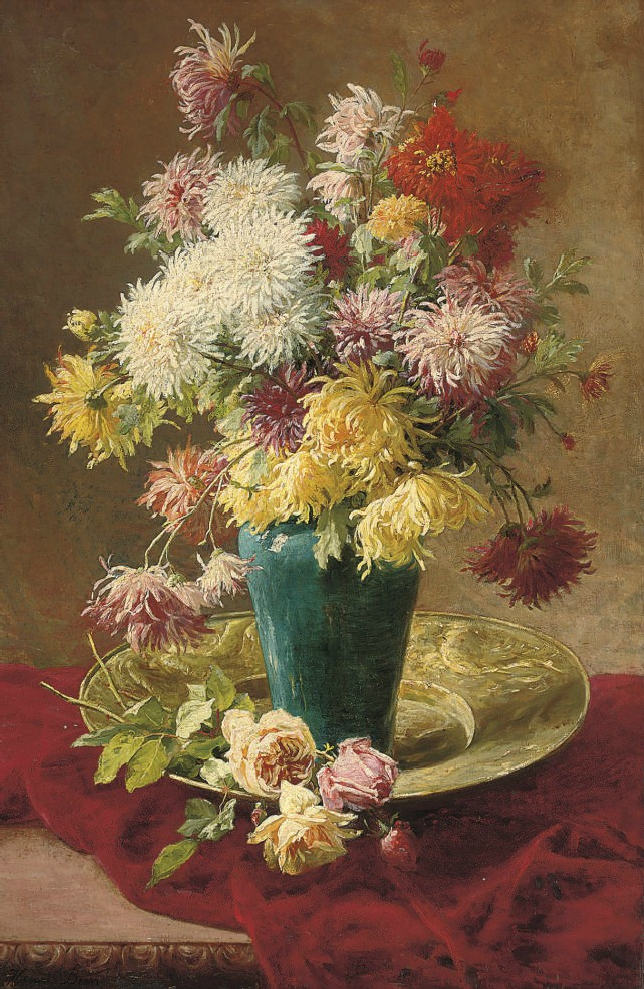
Henri Biva, Chrysanthemums and roses in a vase on a salver, oil on canvas, 122 x 77.8 cm

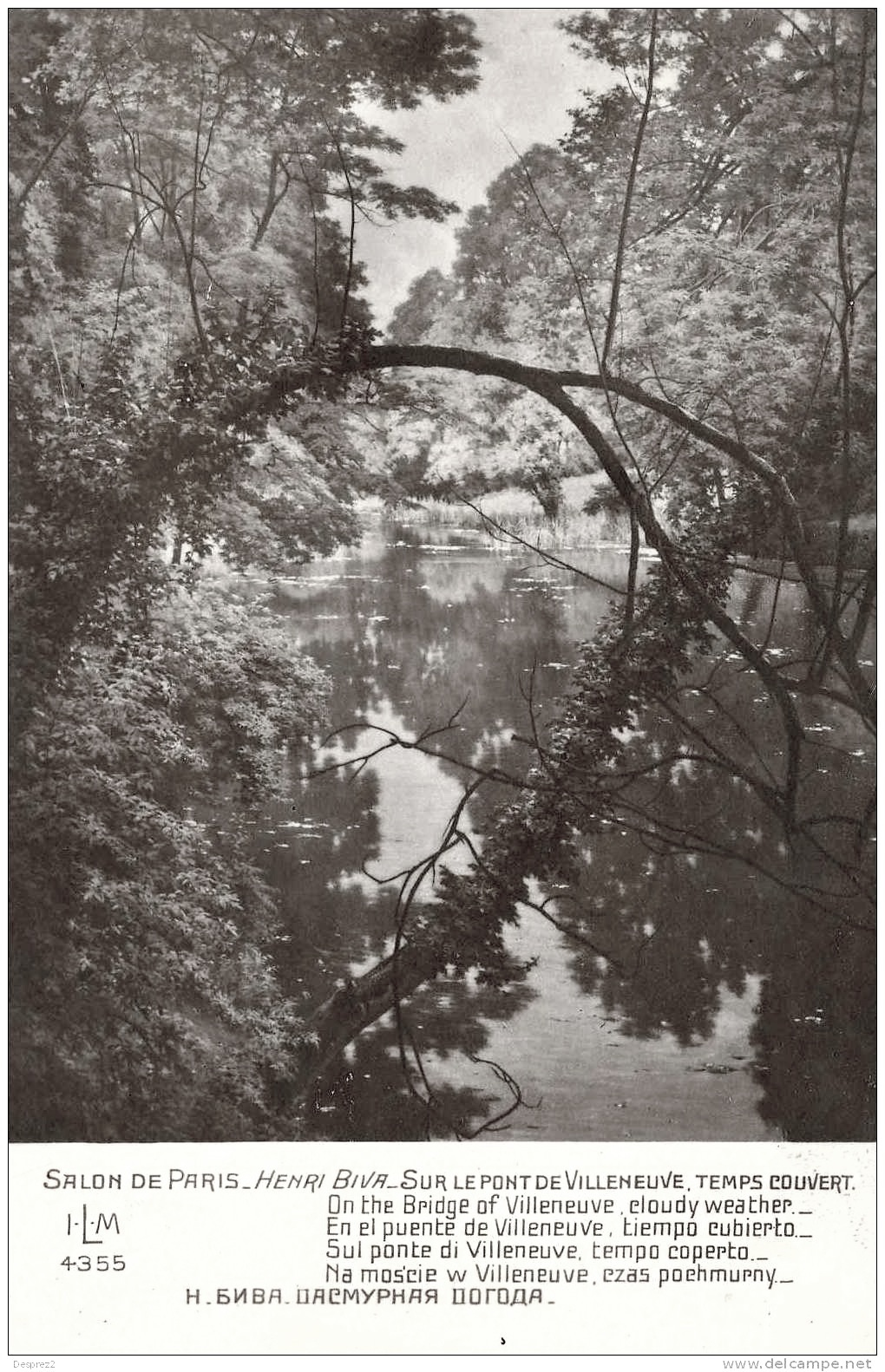
Henri Biva, Sur le Pont de Villeneuve, Temps couvert before 1914. Postcard for the Salon de Paris, 1914. Location, Marnes-la-Coquette (Seine-et-Oise), France

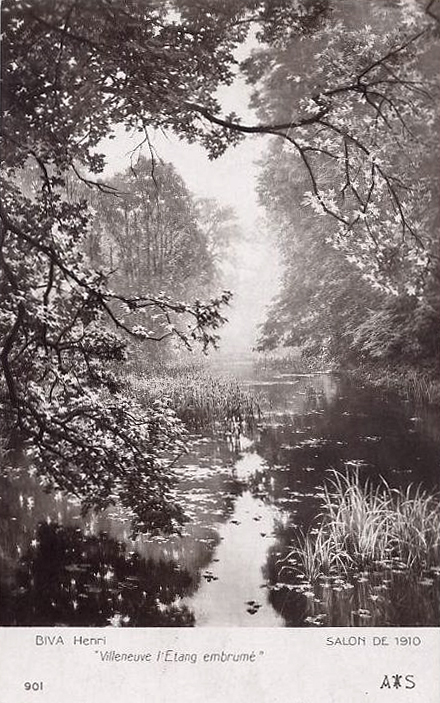
Henri Biva, Le Matin embrumé à Villeneuve-l'Etang, Postcard for the Salon de Paris, 1910.

== Museums and institutions ==
- Base Joconde: Après le coucher du soleil, Musée Baron Gérard, Bayeux, French Ministry of Culture. (in French)
- Musée municipal, Loire-Atlantique; Saint-Nazaire (L'après-midi à Villeneuve-l'Etang ) dat de l'acte 1907
- Musée, Loire; Roanne (Nature Morte)
- Paris, agence photo RMN, fonds Druet-Vizzavona, Paris (Les brumes et rosées du matin; Villeneuve-l'étang, exposé au Salon des Artistes Français de 1907)
- Musée du Luxembourg, Paris, Les brumes, Villeneuve-l'Etang, 1909
