= Matin à Villeneuve =

Painting by Henri Riva (c. 1905)

- From Waters Edge (English)
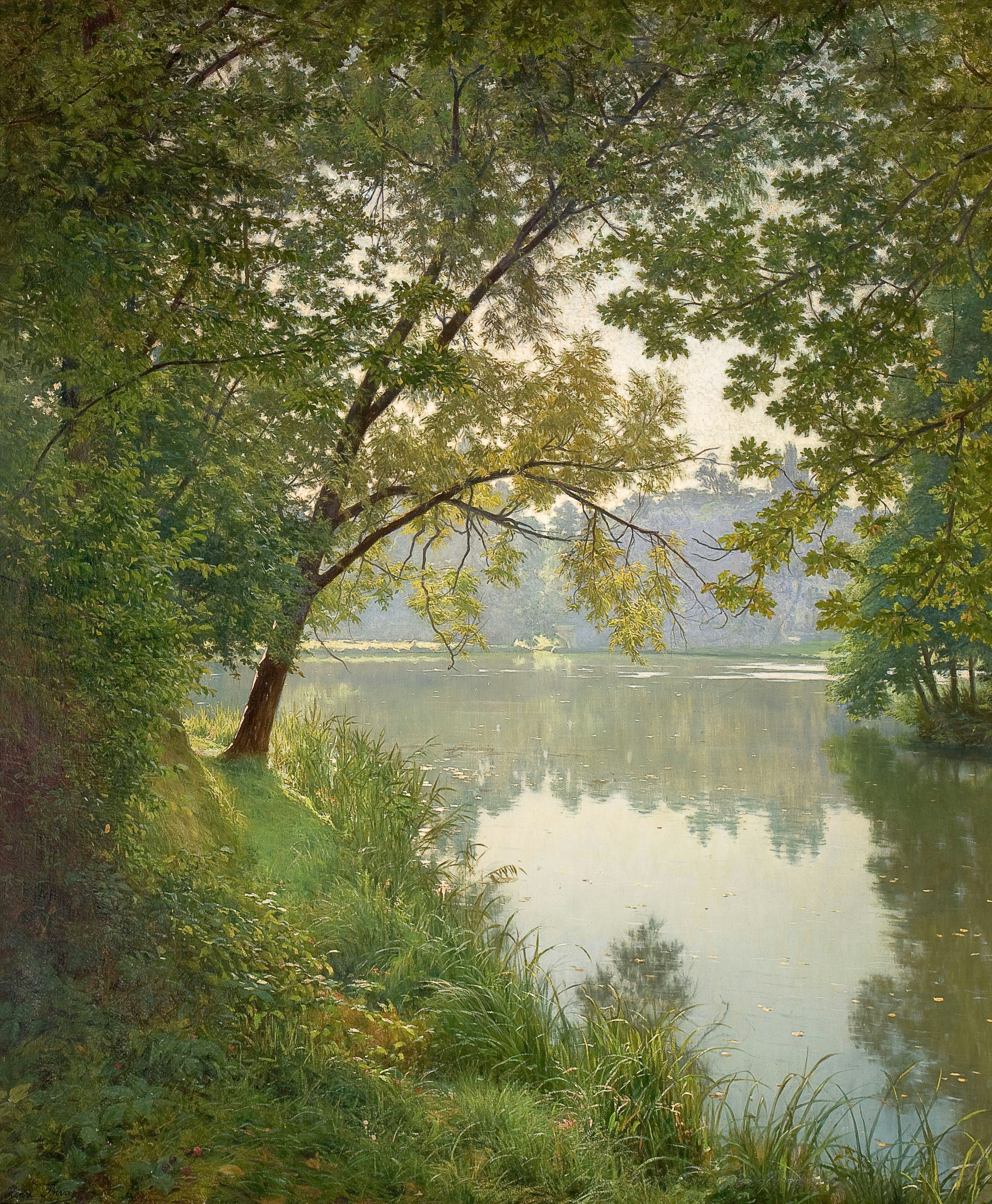
- Artist: Henri Biva
- Year: c.1905
- Medium: Oil on canvas
- Dimensions: 153.7 cm × 127 cm (60.5 in × 50 in)
- Location: Private collection

Matin à Villeneuve, also known as Villeneuve-l'Etang, le matin and From Waters Edge, is a painting created circa 1905 in the Realist tradition with a strong Naturalist component by the French artist Henri Biva (1848–1929). This work was photographed and reproduced as a black and white postcard published for the occasion of the Salon of 1906 in Paris.

== Description ==
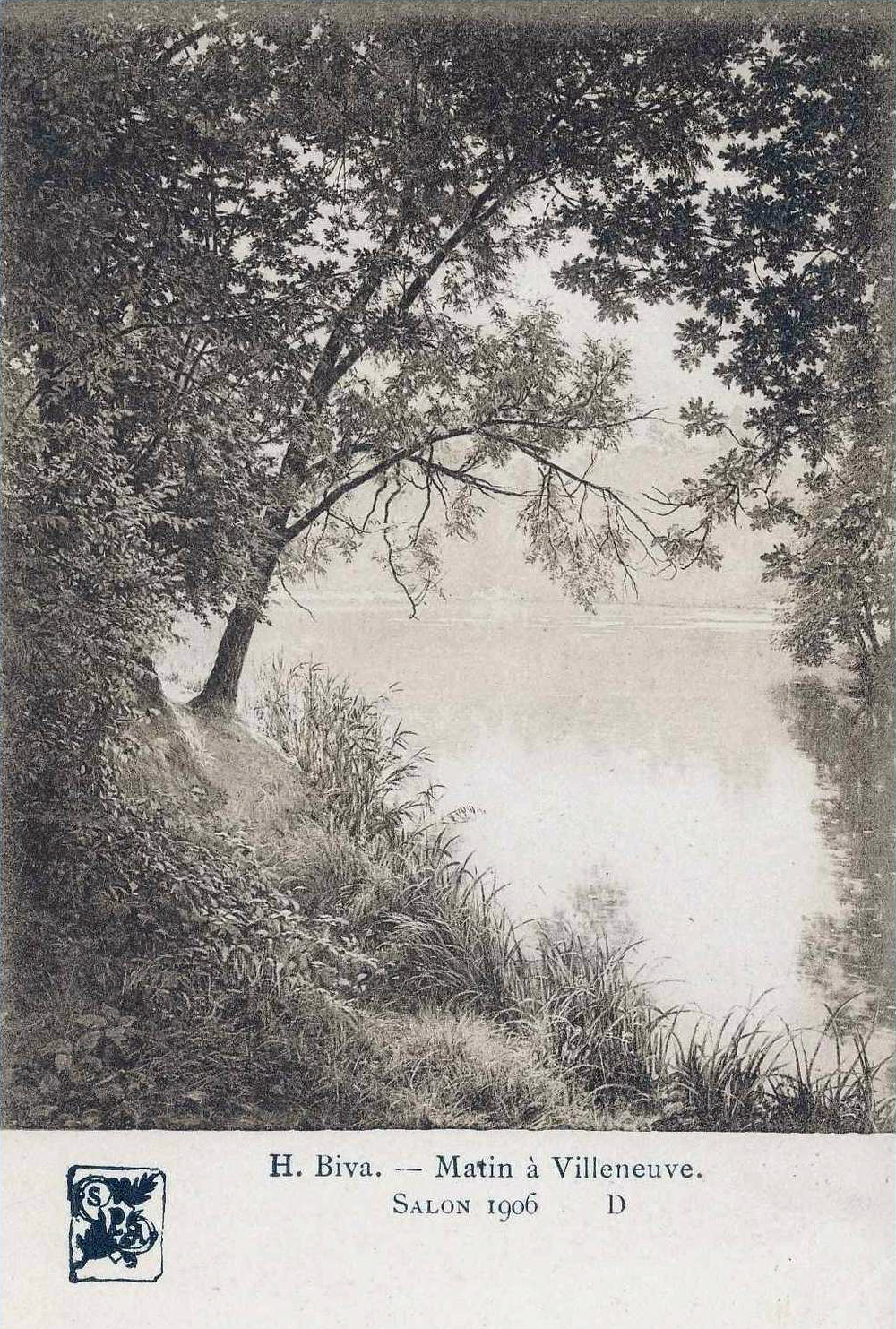
Henri Biva, ca.1905, Matin à Villeneuve, Salon 1906, original postcard, published in 1906.

Matin à Villeneuve is an oil painting on canvas in a vertical format with dimensions 153.7 x 127 cm (60.5 by 50 in), signed by Henri Biva (lower left).

This highly detailed work depicts a morning scene at the Villeneuve-l'étang park, located just outside Paris in the western suburb of Marnes-la-Coquette (Seine-et-Oise), France. The artist has chosen a quiet section of the park with a view facing towards the east. The greenery suggests the work was painted en plein air during July or August, and possibly finished sometime later in Biva's Parisian atelier.

Unlike works of the Neo-Impressionists or Fauves, in vogue at the time, Biva has gone to great lengths to show even the most minute details of the scene, such as leaves and petals floating on the surface of the water; overlapping blades of grass; superimposed branches and leaves of varying size indicating distance from the observer; reflecting background trees in the rippling body of water; patches of raking sunlit shimmering seemingly at random throughout carefully selected sections of the composition.

This work of art presents a dominant palette of green mixed and blended by the artist to form diverse tones, values, and hues, contrasted only by the transpiercing light of the morning sky partly visible through the delicate foliage while bouncing off the surface of the shallows.

== Naturalism ==
The influence of Biva's professors at the École des Beaux-Arts in Paris—Léon Tanzi (1846-1913), a Realist painter, and Alexandre Nozal (1852-1929) a landscape artist—may be seen in Biva's work.

Like the naturalist painters such as Jules Bastien-Lepage or Rosa Bonheur, there is a strong tactile quality to Biva's work, focused on the shapes, colors and forms of the small plants beside the stream or the smooth grey surface of the tree trunks. Equally important in the nineteenth-century marketplace, this type of landscape painting offered an intimate glimpse of a specific locale, a reminder of days spent in the French countryside, or perhaps at the immense forest preserves surrounding Paris. Unlike contemporaries such as Pissarro or Monet, Biva's landscapes suggest a time before industrialization when no railroad or factory disrupted rural vistas. Rather, these images show no evidence of human activity at all except for the occasional fisherman drowsing by the riverside.

== Related works ==
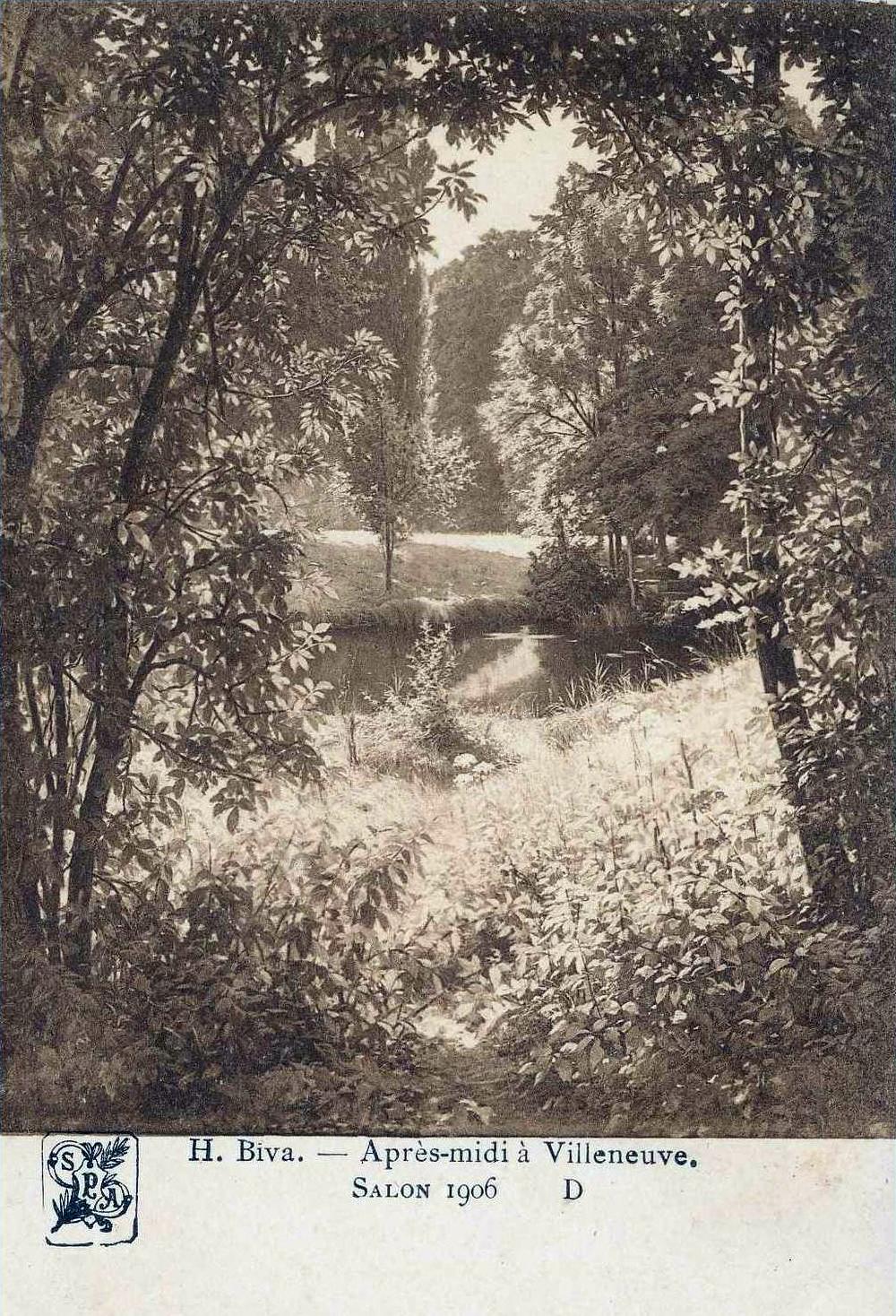
Henri Biva, Aprés-midi à Villeneuve-l'Etang, Salon 1906, postcard

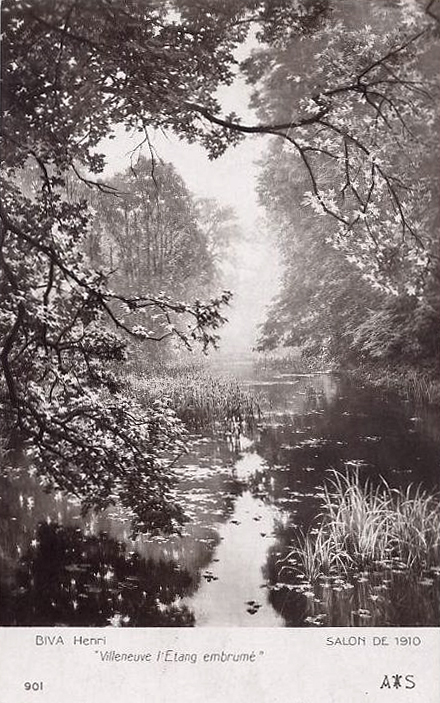
Henri Biva, Le Matin embrumé à Villeneuve-l'Etang, Salon de Paris, 1910 postcard

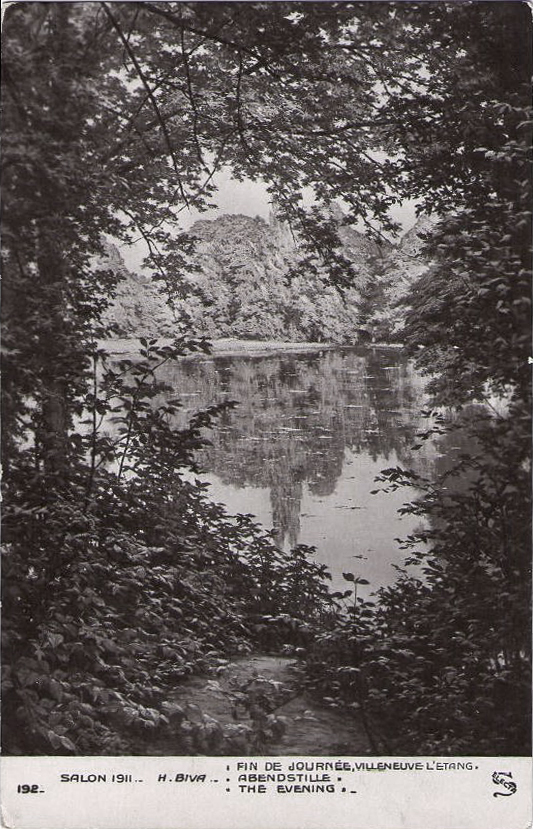
Henri Biva, Fin de journée, Villeneuve-l'Etang (The evening), Salon 1911 postcard

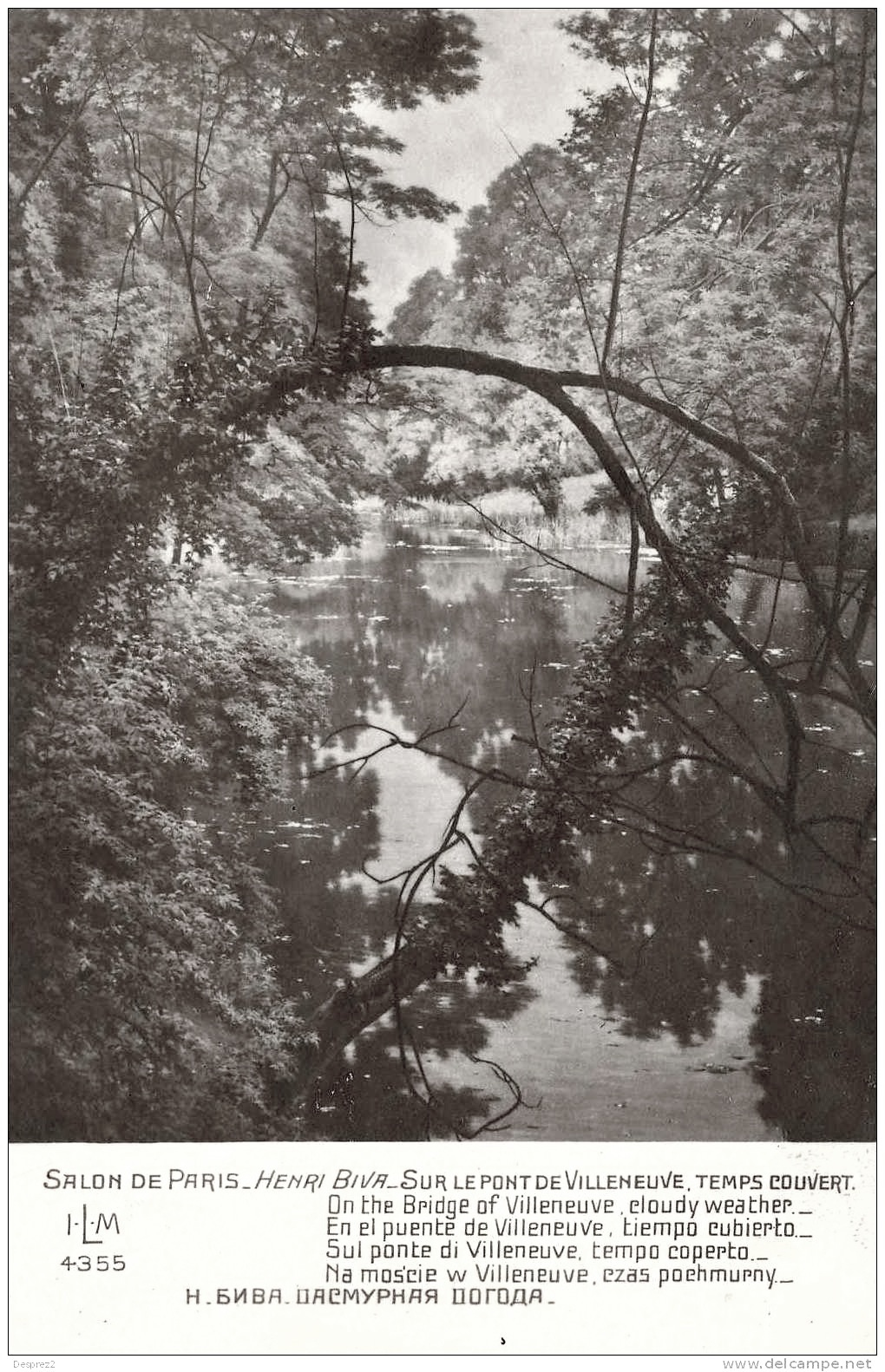
Henri Biva, Sur le Pont de Villeneuve, Temps couvert, Salon de Paris postcard published 1914
