= Lucien Biva =

French–American artist (1878–1965)

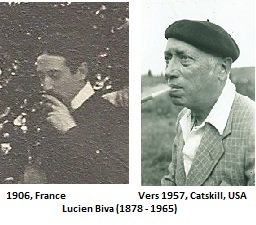
- Born: Lucien Felix Biva; 13 August 1878; Paris, France
- Died: October 1965 (aged 87); New York
- Known for: Painting
- Notable work: Roses in a Vase; Bouquet de Rose; Derniers rayons, Villeneuve-l’Étang; Les foins, soleil couchant; Derniers rayons sur le lac de la Malmaison; Winding river, Ardsley, New York; Brook, Haines Falls, Catskill; White face Mt, Adirondacks
- Movement: Realism, Naturalism, Post–impressionism

Lucien Felix Biva (13 August 1878 – October 1965) was a French–American artist. He studied painting early on with his father, the Naturalist painter Henri Biva. He was also the nephew of the painter Paul Biva. Between 1921 and 1949 he was an ornamental designer for textile fabrics and similar articles of manufacture having surface ornamentation, patenting over eighty designs with the United States Patent Office. He was a member of the Society of French Artists and the Society of Independent Artists.

== Biography ==
Lucien Biva, Roses in a Vase, oil on canvas, 49 x 59 cm

Biva was born in Paris, where his family lived in Montmartre, 18 rue du Vieux Chemin de Paris (named rue Ravignan after 1867), and it is from designer Charles Biva (1821–1884), father of Henri Biva and Paul Biva that the family developed its artistic talents. In 1845, motivated by the fashion of the time for bourgeois interior ornamentation, Charles Biva opened a wallpaper factory in a northern suburb of Paris where his sons Henri and Paul began their apprenticeship as designers and colorists.

Lucien Biva benefited from the creativity inherent in his family, as well as from the proliferation of artistic environment of Montmartre at the end of 19th century and early 20th century, the so–called the Belle Époque.

=== The family influence ===
Lucien Biva first studied under his father, then enrolled at the École nationale supérieure des arts décoratifs, and the École nationale supérieure des beaux-arts of Paris. At this time his professors included the poster designer Eugène Grasset (1845–1917). His education formed him as a painter but also as an interior designer and decorator.

He exhibited for the first time at the Salon des artistes français in 1902, with an entry titled Derniers rayons à Villeneuve-l’Étang, and exhibited there regularly until 1914. Other exhibition venues that saw his participation during this period included Salon des Indépendants in 1909.

=== United States ===
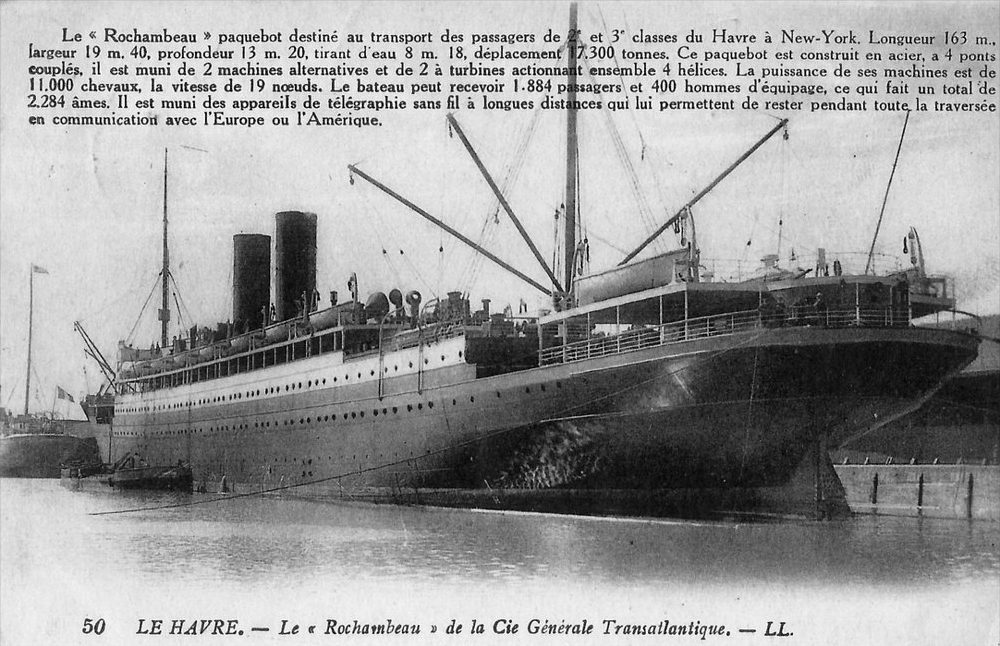
Le Rochambeau, Compagnie Générale Transatlantique, at Le Havre, circa 1919

During the month of August 1919, Lucien Biva left Le Havre aboard the transatlantic ocean liner Le Rochambeau. On the first of September he debarked in New York City where he would reside throughout the rest of his career.

Various reasons impelled Lucien Biva to emigrate to the United States. His father was a well-known painter, and it may have been difficult for Lucien Biva to make a name for himself without being linked to the work of his father.

In the press chroniclers speak of "the Biva's" assimilating the son behind the father, and tended to write of the Biva brothers, confusing in a single work that of Henri and Paul Biva. In 1903, the Bulletin de la Société des amis des arts du département de l'Eure Henry Chantraine evokes the Exposition des beaux-arts d’Evreux: "Passing in front of the Dahlias with its rich impasto and the Village, with violent tones, but already much more moderate [than those of Lucien Lamarre, mentioned above by the columnist] of MM. Henri and Lucien Biva [...]."

Lucien Biva, Bouquet de Rose, oil on canvas, 61 x 51 cm

Lucien Biva's family nicknamed him "the anarchist", perhaps because he rejected part of the family pictorial legacy. In New York, when he exhibited at the Sixth Annual Exhibition of the Society of Independent Artists, he was cited with other artists in the columns of New York Times (10 March 1922) as "stamped all over with the stamp of independence". It may be noted that the statement of the chronicler was somewhat tinged with irony. Since Society of Independent Artists created in 1916 was modeled after Société des Artistes Indépendants created in Paris in 1884, the author seems to have suggested this "independent" movement was already classical.

Other family reasons probably contributed to his departure for the States in 1919, at the age of 41. World War I had just ended, but his younger brother, jewelry designer Marius Biva, also formed at the École nationale supérieure des arts décoratifs, died at Verdun in 1915 at the age of 25 years.

=== American nationality ===
Lucien Biva became an American citizen in 1928, residing mostly in New York City, Brooklyn, Queens, White Plains and Catskill. He painted and exhibited throughout the second leg of his career in the United States.

=== Design ===
Between 1921 and 1949 Biva patented ornamental designs for textile fabrics and other articles of manufacture having surface ornamentation, patenting over eighty designs with the United States Patent Office.

At least one of Biva's designs, U.S. patent 59.177 of 1921, inspired other patents, such as U.S. patent 5,445,863, of 1995, used in clothing and other camouflage material for activities such as hunting and military maneuvers.

Lucien Biva, Après-midi, Villeneuve l'Etang, Salon 1912 postcard. At this time Lucien Biva lived at 29, rue des Vinaigriers in Paris

U.S. Pat. No. D-59,177 issued to Lucien Biva on Oct. 4, 1921 discloses a design for a Textile Fabric or similar article wherein the material is gathered and apparently sewn along straight seams at regular intervals to create a rippled or wrinkled appearance. However, the regular spacing of the seams and their straight lines fail to provide a natural appearance, as is accomplished with the irregular seams of the present invention.

== Œuvre ==
The early works of Lucien Biva are often difficult to distinguish from those of his father Henri Biva.

But when he left France in 1919, other artistic influences infused his style—Les Nabis, Art Nouveau and Fauvism—influences left over from his associations with artists at the Salon des Indépendants. With realism in his past, Biva's new work consisted of colorful landscapes, with certain titles of his paintings emphasizing the primacy given to colors.

Lucein Biva's work was shown in New York in the form of a retrospective exhibition, November 1957, at the Albany Institute of History & Art Early works painted in France were juxtaposed with contemporary works painted in the United States, depicting a variety of places and subjects.

He died in New York, aged 87.

== Selected exhibition entries ==
=== France ===
Salon des artistes français, Exposition des Beaux-arts d’Évreux and Salon des Indépendants

- 1902, Derniers rayons, Villeneuve-l’Étang; La mare, fond du bois
- 1903, La Prairie blanche, printemps; Étude Couton-Veyrac-Jamault
- 1903, Village
- 1904, Le Moulin de Tomblaine, près Nancy
- 1905, La mare aux canards
- 1906, Les foins, soleil couchant
- 1910, Derniers rayons sur le lac de la Malmaison
- 1911, Les Derniers rayons à Villeneuve-l’Étang
- 1912, Après-midi, Villeneuve-l’Étang; Les dernières fleurs; Automne au Grand Trianon
- 1913, La rivière à Villeneuve
- 1914, Villeneuve, matinée

=== United States ===
- 1921, Fifth Annual Exhibition of the Society of Independent Artists: no jury, no prizes, Waldorf Astoria, New York, The White Plain (Landscape in France), no. 58 and When the Sun is Setting, no. 59
- 1922, Sixth Annual Exhibition of the Society of Independent Artists: no jury, no prizes, Waldorf Astoria, New York, 1922, The Girl and the Parrot, no. 73, The Hudson River, no. 74
- 1945, the newsletter of the University John B. Stetson refers to the acquisition of one hundred paintings in order to create a museum of fine arts. Lucien Biva is mentioned among the artists selected.

1957, Retrospective at Albany Institute of History and Art

- Field of heather
- Our peonies
- Harvest time, Chartres, France
- Lilacs in Vase
- Moulin de la Galette, Montmartre
- Apples, grapes, tea, kettle
- The Little fisherman
- Farmyard, Normandy, France
- Autumn pond, White Plains
- Washday, Brittany, France
- New York skyline, from studio
- Old country road, France
- Tea for two
- Peaches, pears in candlelight
- Brittany coast, France
- Incense burner and chrysanthemums
- Peonies in iridescent vase
- Fireworks, Montmartre
- La rue St. Rustique, Montmartre
- Villeneuve-l’Etang, France
- Thawing, Dourdon, France
- Brook, Haines Falls, Catskill
- Village church, France
- White face Mt, Adirondacks
- Low tide, Douarnenez, France
- Autumn, White Face Mt, Adirondacks
- New York Bay, from studio
- Sunflowers in old jug
- Our barn, Catskill
- The Mistletoe, Orléans, France
- Catskill pond
- Springtime in Saint-Cloud, France
- Stony Brook, Ardsley, New York
- Winding river, Ardsley, New York
- Palisades, Englewood
- Chrysanthemums in Chinese vase
- Pam

== Bibliography ==
Lucien Biva, La Rivière, Villeneuve, Salon de Paris, vintage postcard

- Bulletin artistique de l'Est, Volumes 9-10, 1903, Nouvelles, Musée municipal de Toul
- Société des Amis des Arts du Département de l'Eure, Impr. C. Hérissey, 1904
- Le Ménestrel, Volume 76, 1910
- Societe nationale d'horticulture de France
- Le Magasin pittoresque, Jouvet & cie., 1912
- Le Magasin pittoresque, Jouvet & cie., 1913
- Aristide Frézard, Stanislas Frézard, Revue des eaux et forêts, Volume 53, Berger-Levrault, 1915
- Benezit E, Dictionary of Painters, Sculptors, Designers and Engravers, 1999, Volume 2, p. 356
- Peter H. Falk, Audrey M. Lewis, Who was Who in American Art, 1564-1975, Vol I, p. 329

== U.S. patents ==
- Fibre & Fabric: A Record of American Textile Industries in the Cotton and Woolen Trade, Volume 69, 1921
- Design for a textile fabric or similar article, Patented 4 October 1921
- Official Gazette of the United States Patent Office, Volume 289, the University of Wisconsin - Madison, 1921
- Textile World, Volume 60, Part 2, Bragdon, Lord & Nagle Company, 1921
- Annual report of the Commissioner of Patents, United States. Patent Office, G.P.O. 1922
- Official Gazette of the United States Patent Office, Volume 367, 1928
- Design for a textile fabric, Patented 17 July 1928
- Textile fabric, Patented 10 December 1929
- Official gazette of the United States Patent Office, 1930
- Design for a rug, L. Biva, 7 January 1941
- Official Gazette of the United States Patent Office, Volume 522, Lucien Biva, The Office, Pennsylvania State University, 1941
- Dec. 2, 1941, L. BIVA. Des. 130,567. RUG. Filed Oct. 28, 1941
- Dec. 2, 1941. L. BIVA. Des. 130,568 . RUG. Filed Oct. 28, 1941
