= Lycée Français de Séville =

French international school in Spain

Lycée Français de Séville Spanish: Liceo Francés de Sevilla

Location
- Seville; Spain

Information
- School type: International School
- Established: 2008
- Language: French

Lycée Français de Séville (Spanish: Liceo Francés de Sevilla) is a French school which welcomes pupils from age 2 to final year in Seville, Spain. The school is part of the worldwide network of French schools abroad. It is approved by the French Ministry of Education for all primary, collège and lycée classes. It is managed by the Mission Laïque Française (MLF).

== History ==
The Lycée Français International de Séville opened in 2008 as a company school (Renault/Airbus). It was initially located at the junction of Avenida Torneo and Calle Baños. In 2015, it moved to the Edificio de la Prensa on Avenida Carlos III.

== Location ==
Since 2015, the Lycée Français International de Séville has been located in the Edificio de la Prensa, on the island of La Cartuja, north-west of Seville near the Guadalquivir. It is served by bus routes C1 and C2 and is accessible from the SE-30 motorway. It shares the building with ESIC.

The Edificio de la Prensa is one of the buildings constructed for the 1992 Universal Exhibition in Seville. It was designed to accommodate journalists from all over the world covering the event.

== Education ==
The Lycée Français International de Séville focuses on the learning of three languages: French, Spanish and English.

The school teaches the French curriculum as well as literature and history-geography in Spanish. The school prepares students to the French diplomas (diplôme national du Brevet and diplôme national du Baccalauréat) and the Spanish diploma (Bachillerato).

The Lycée Français International de Séville has a European section in English. It provides five specialities in Première and Terminale: mathematics, physics-chemistry, biology, economics and geopolitics.

== Student numbers ==
When it opened, the school had 37 students, mainly children of Airbus employees. It now has 350 students from 25 different nationalities.

== The project FTIC in 2025 ==
The Lycée Français de Séville will be moving to a new site next to the Torre Sevilla complex in 2025, following the purchase in 2023 of the 13,200 square metre site known as the parcel de las banderas.

== See also ==
- La Mission Laïque française, French language and culture association
