= Expo '92 =

Universal exposition in Spain

1992 Seville

Overview
- BIE-class: Universal exposition
- Name: Exposición Universal de Sevilla 1992
- Motto: The Age of Discoveries
- Area: 215 hectares (530 acres)
- Visitors: 41,814,571
- Organized by: Manuel Olivencia
- Mascot: Curro

Participant(s)
- Countries: 112

Location
- Country: Spain
- City: Seville
- Venue: Isla de La Cartuja
- Coordinates: 37°24′30″N 6°0′1″W

Timeline
- Bidding: 3 March 1982
- Awarded: 8 December 1982
- Opening: 20 April 1992
- Closure: 12 October 1992

Universal expositions
- Previous: Expo '70 in Osaka
- Next: Expo '98 in Lisbon

Specialized expositions
- Previous: Expo 91 in Plovdiv
- Next: Taejon Expo '93 in Taejon

Horticultural expositions
- Previous: Expo '90 in Osaka
- Next: 1993 World Horticultural Exposition in Stuttgart

Simultaneous
- Specialized: Genoa Expo '92
- Horticultural (AIPH): Floriade 1992

Internet
- Website: Seville Expo '92

The Universal Exhibition of Seville 1992 – Expo '92 (officially: Exposición Universal de Sevilla 1992) was a universal exhibition held from Monday 20 April to Monday 12 October 1992, at the Isla de La Cartuja, in Seville, Spain. The theme for the expo was "The Age of Discoveries", celebrating the 500th anniversary of Christopher Columbus reaching the Americas, and over 100 countries were represented. The site of the exposition covered 215 hectares (530 acres) and the total number of visitors was 41,814,571. The exposition ran at the same time as the smaller and shorter-duration Genoa Expo '92, a Specialized Exhibition, held in memory of Christopher Columbus in Genoa.

After the exhibition, the site was divided between the Cartuja Science and Technology Park, which uses many of the pavilions and structures built for the fair, and the grounds where the theme park Isla Mágica and the water park Agua Mágica were later built. Administrative services and city facilities have also moved to some of the buildings and plots left by the fair.

== Organisation ==
Expo '92 was organised to celebrate the 500th anniversary (1492–1992) of Christopher Columbus reaching the Americas. The exhibition was to be jointly held with the City of Chicago, however, due to national, state, and local funding difficulties, the Chicago 1992 World's Fair was ultimately cancelled.

The Commissioner-General of Expo '92 was Manuel Olivencia.

=== New infrastructures ===
Important public infrastructures were built for the exhibition. The Madrid–Seville high-speed rail line was built as the first high-speed rail line in Spain, with commercial AVE service by Renfe beginning on 21 April 1992 between Madrid Atocha and the new Seville–Santa Justa stations, with stops in Ciudad Real, Puertollano, Córdoba, and the exhibition site itself. Seville Airport was renovated and expanded and the new Plaza de Armas intercity bus station was inaugurated on 31 March 1992. The SE-30 highway was built as a ring road around Seville, including the Centenario Bridge, and was inaugurated on 15 November 1991. Five more new bridges were built over the Guadalquivir river: Alamillo, Barqueta, Cartuja, Cristo de la Expiración, and Delicias. A whole neighbourhood was developed in Mairena del Aljarafe to house the participants of the fair.

== Site ==
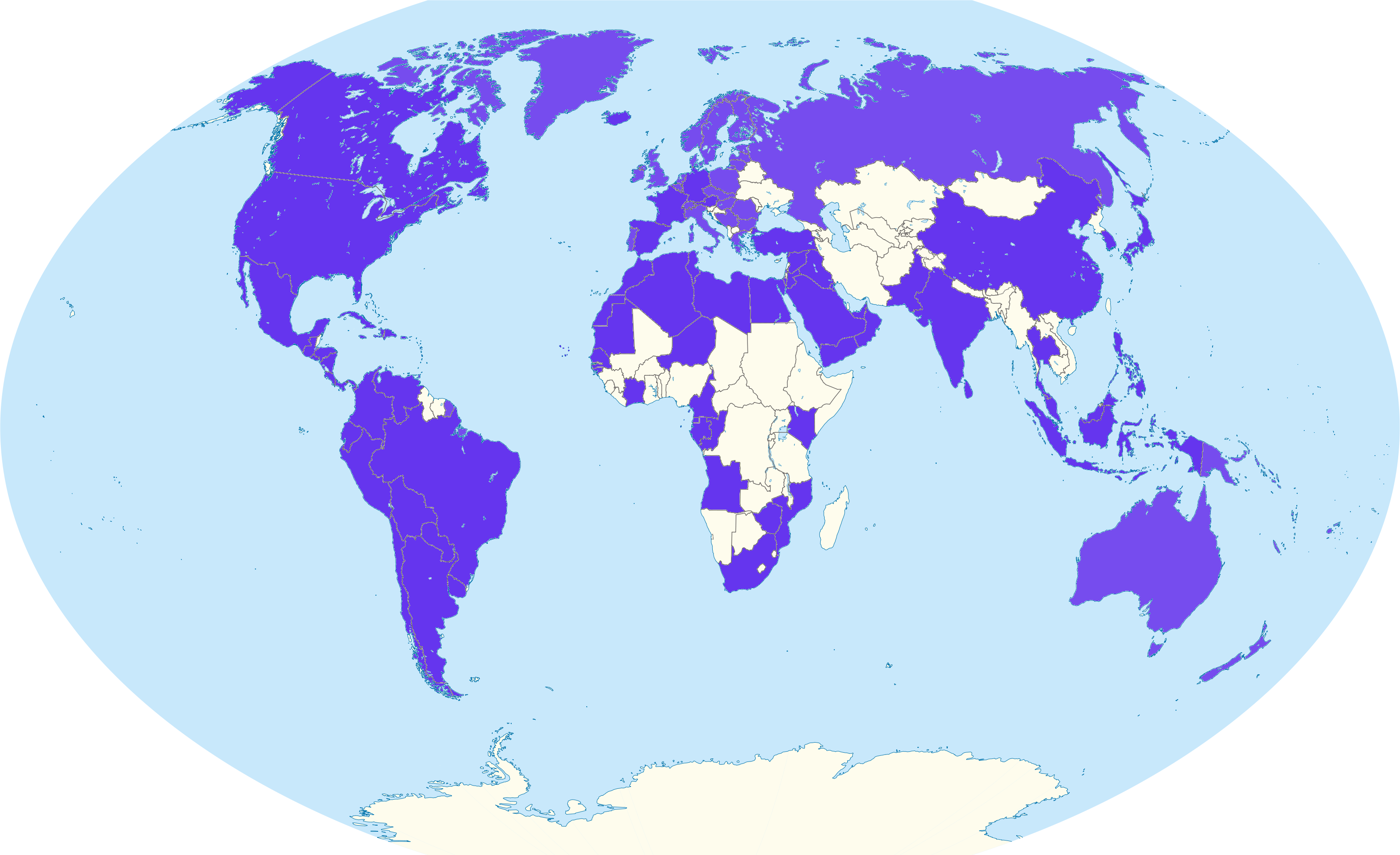
Countries present at Expo '92.

Expo '92 was known for its massive site covering 215 hectares (530 acres) of the Isla de La Cartuja, a place of reference for Columbus for his voyage to the New World, and required at least several days to visit most of the pavilions. It was also known for its numerous spectacular gates and bridges, and the diversity of transport within the expo site from bus to ferry boat, to cable car and monorail. To serve the exhibition, the largest-ever parking lot was built next to it, with capacity for 36,000 cars, 1,410 coaches and 2,578 service vehicles, which was used by four million vehicles during the fair.

The expo also gave an impressive architectural tour of the world, with many countries vying for the position of the most inventive or creative pavilion structure. Outstanding amongst these was the Pavilion of Japan –the world's largest wooden structure–, the Pavilion of Morocco –a re-creation of a Moroccan Palace-Mansion–, and the modernistic cube and sphere of the flagship Pavilion of Spain, to name a few. The most popular pavilions with visitors were those of Spain and Canada.

During the exhibition, the expo site opened its doors at 9:00 am and closed at 4:00 am the following day, with the pavilions open from 10:00 am to 10:00 pm. Each day was dedicated to a different participating country or organization and events related to it were held. There were shows and street entertainment throughout the day. A large parade, entitled The Magic of Time and created by the theatre company Comediants, toured the site at dusk. At 10:30 pm, there was a grand show of light, sound, projections on water screens, and fireworks on the Lake of Spain. After 10:30 pm, except in the international zone which was fenced off, nightclubs opened, restaurants and bars remained open, and there were evening shows, concerts, and film screenings. Visitors could purchase tickets to visit the expo during the whole day, or just for the evening. (Note: Evening tickets allowed access to the site from 8:30 pm.)

The HD-MAC standard, an early analog high-definition television system, was demonstrated at the expo.

== Pavilions ==
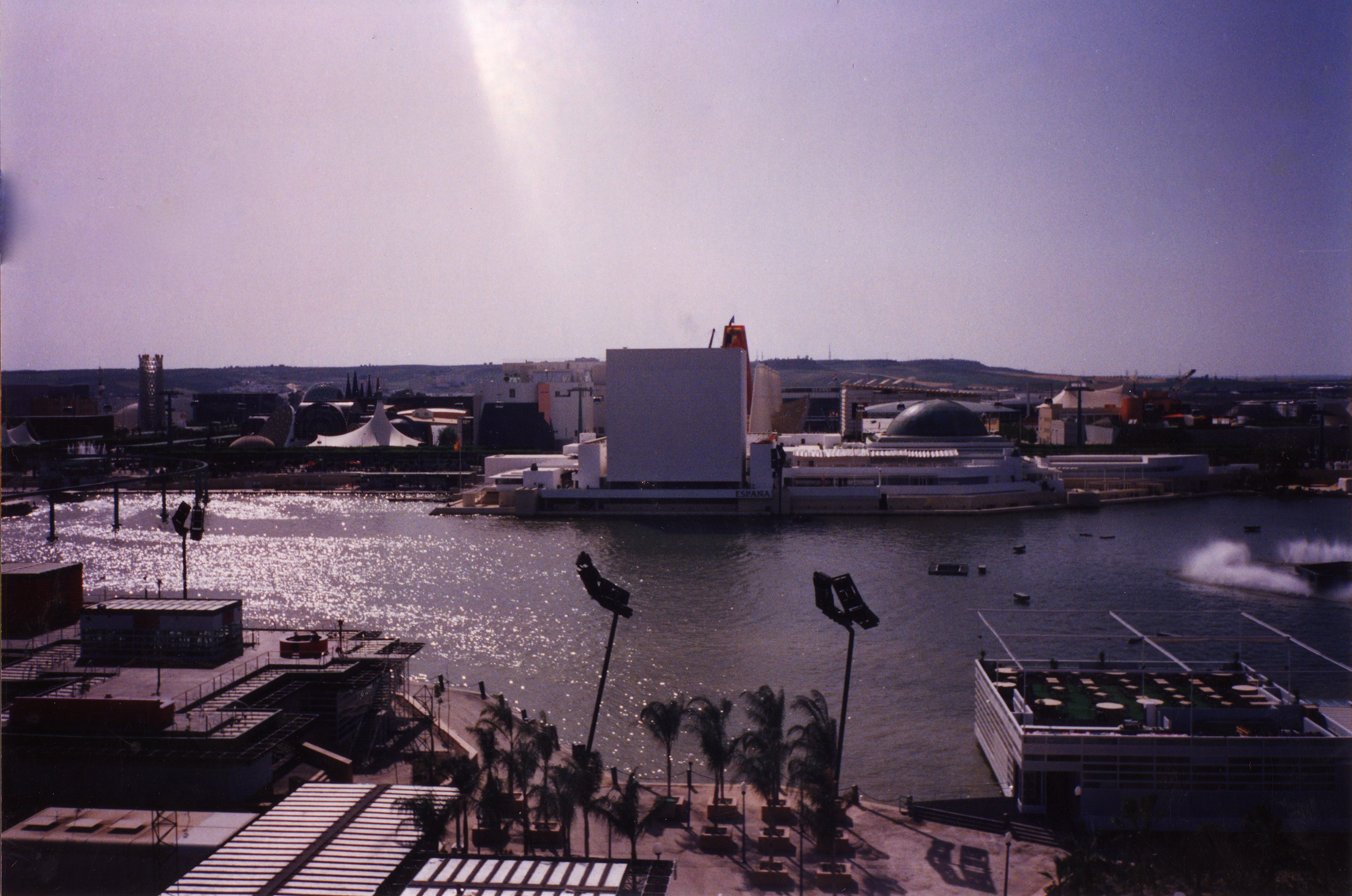
Lake of Spain with the Pavilion of Spain in the background.

Pavilions at the expo consisted of the Royal Pavilion and the five thematic pavilions –the Fifteenth Century, Discoveries, Nature, Navigation, and Plaza del Futuro; the flagship pavilions of Spain and Andalusia at the Lake of Spain; the Spanish Autonomous Regions pavilions all along the Lake of Spain; over a hundred international pavilions; and several corporate pavilions, making it one of the largest ever hosted up to that time.

To offset costs by developing nations, and to allow a first-ever representation by every Latin American nation in an universal exhibition, a permanent monumental structure, the Plaza de América was constructed, a large enclosed plaza-type building in a rustic red colour which also hosted a special Exhibition on the Gold of South America. A Plaza de África was also built to allow maximum participation from developing African countries. For the same reason, several ephemeral pavilions were built to group together the Arab, Baltic, Caribbean, and the South Pacific countries in each one.

Building still standing in its original location
X Building demolished after the exhibition
↑ Building dismantled after the exhibition and rebuilt in another location

=== Thematic pavilions ===
Pavilion	Type	Architect(s)	Description
Royal	Permanent		The Monastery of Santa Maria de las Cuevas was restored for the exhibition under direction of Bartolomé Ruiz González. It housed the Royal Pavilion that was used for official receptions and events. Since 1997, the monastery houses the Andalusian Contemporary Art Center (CAAC).
15th Century	Permanent	Francisco Torres	The pavilion was built within the monastery grounds. Its contents showed visitors the way of life in 15th century Europe. The building is today part of the CAAC.
Discoveries	Permanent X	Javier Feduchi	The pavilion that was to be the flagship of the Exposition burned down on 18 February, two months before the opening, destroying many valuable exhibits that were being set up for display. Only the adjoining Omnimax cinema was saved, which was able to operate during the fair. It showed the film Eureka, the passion for discovery, made for the occasion by Greg MacGillivray and Jon Boorstin, that was based on The Discoverers by Daniel J. Boorstin. It was the first IMAX film to use a light-weight hand held camera (with a steadicam), and it won the principal creative award at the fair.
Nature	Permanent	Luis Fernando Gómez Stern	The pavilion consisted of a main exhibition building and a greenhouse. Adjacent to the pavilion is the American Garden.
Navigation	Permanent	Guillermo Vázquez Consuegra	The pavilion is built of steel, glass, and wood imitating the inverted keel of a boat. Among its contents during the fair were the rooms that recreated the interior of a ship at the time of Columbus. Next to the pavilion, docked in the river were the replicas of Nao Victoria, La Pinta, La Niña, and La Santa María. (Note: The replicas of the three ships used by Columbus are docked today at the Wharf of the Caravels in Palos de la Frontera. The replica of Nao Victoria was also on display on Expo 2005, and today she travels the world spreading the history of Spanish navigation.) The building houses today a naval museum.
Plaza del Futuro	Permanent	Josep Maria Martorell, Oriol Bohigas, David Mackay, Peter Rice	The Plaza del Futuro was constructed in part with post-tensioned stone arches. It contained four pavilions: Environment, Energy, Telecommunications, and Universe.

=== National pavilions ===
Country	Type	Architect(s)	Description
Individual pavilions
Algeria	Ephemeral X	Agustín Prudencio Díaz	The pavilion was inspired by the country's Islamic buildings, with its interior resembling the Algerian desert with a nomadic tent, a village of artisans, ornamental fountains, and native plants.
Australia	Ephemeral X	Philip Page, David Rendon, Martínez Zúñiga y Donaire	Featured a curved walkway entrance with a several-story rainforest atrium, with tropical palm trees, birds and butterflies from the State of Queensland; a large aquarium tank representing the ecosystem of the Great Barrier Reef, resplendent with live tropical fish and coral; an Australian Gold Exhibition, featuring precious Australian works of jewellery, most notably including the Argyle Library Egg; and the Australian Cinema presentation, the Australian Hexaplex, a moving five-screen 360-degree slide and video presentation, set to music, featuring footage from the width and breadth of the Australian nation. A Gift Shop also featured, presented by the Australian Broadcasting Corporation's Gift Shop stores arm.
Austria	Permanent X	Volker Giencke	This steel and glass pavilion had a transparent gabled roof with a protection system that let in light but reflected solar energy to mitigate the high temperatures in Seville. Added to this was a water screen that ran across the roof to keep the pavilion cool.
Belgium	Ephemeral X	Thomaes, Driesen, and Meersman	The pavilion was dedicated to the dialogue between humanity and science. It also housed an exhibition of paintings by renowned artists.
Canada	Permanent	Bing Thom	The highlight of the pavilion of Canada was the National Film Board of Canada film Momentum, the world's only motion picture presented in 48 frames per second IMAX HD. The pavilion also had an artificial pond surrounding a stage with performances that entertained visitors queuing for the pavilion. In addition to a gift shop and exhibit area, the pavilion also housed the Aurora Borealis restaurant that served Arctic fare from northern Canada. The building houses today the EOI Business School.
Chile	Ephemeral	Germán del Sol, José Cruz	The building was built entirely of laminated wood with undulating contours, and the red roof was reinforced with copper plates, the main mineral produced in Chile. It housed a 60 tonnes (59 long tons; 66 short tons) Antarctic iceberg brought from Paradise Harbour. Although it was originally designed as a temporary building, it still stands today.
China	Ephemeral X	Wang Song Jiang	China was represented with a large Chinese Gate at its entrance, and a large magnificent tapestry of the Great Wall of China on the inside entrance. To one side the sights of China were represented in a 360-degree cinema presentation.
Cuba	Ephemeral	José Ramón Moreno, Orestes del Castillo	The achievements of contemporary Cuba in science, biotechnology and tourism were exhibited in the pavilion, as well as its history. The building houses today an engineering company.
Cyprus	Ephemeral X	Cristos Theodorou	Among the artifacts on display was Kyrenia II, a full-size sailing reconstruction of Kyrenia, a 4th-century BC merchant ship that sank c. 294 BC near Kyrenia and was re-discovered in November 1965.
Czechoslovakia	Ephemeral X	Martín Nemec, Jan Stempel	The pavilion was designed as a large black box with a steel structure with glass and ceramic surfaces.
Denmark	Ephemeral ↑	Jon Sondergeerd	The pavilion stood out for its sail-like shape and its interior natural cooling system. The building was dismantled after the exhibition and rebuilt in Kyōtamba (Japan) where it is part of a Danish cultural museum.
France	Permanent	Jean-Paul Viguier, Jean-François Jodry, Francois Seigneur	The building stands out for three of its parts: the canopy, the mirror wall, and the open plaza. The interior tour led visitors to discover the French history and culture like in an "imaginary library". The building houses today a business center.
Finland	Permanent	Jaaskelainen, Sanaksenaho, Rouhiainen, Kaakko, Tirkkonen	The pavilion consists of two separate buildings, separated by a narrow corridor. One is a slender construction of steel and glass and the other is built in Finnish pine wood. They house today a foundation of the College of Architects of Seville.
Germany	Ephemeral X	Lippsimeier	The pavilion stood out for the elliptical canopy that was suspended in the air above the building. On behalf of the German Federal President Richard von Weizsäcker the show theater "Traumfabrik" created and organised the "German Day" and represented Germany culturally.
Greece	Ephemeral X	Mariano Villalonga, Luis Leirado Campo	The pavilion showed the country's relationship with the sea since ancient times.
Holy See	Ephemeral X	Miguel de Oriol e Ybarra	The pavilion was covered with a set of vaults reminiscent of traditional churches.
India	Ephemeral X	García-Rosales y Pellicer	The architecture of the pavilion of India represented an Indian peacock, with a blue mast for the neck and head, and angled tiles representing the many-coloured tail plume.
Indonesia	Ephemeral X	Fernando Mendoza Castells	The pavilion was crowned with a reproduction of a typical Indonesian hut.
Ireland	Ephemeral X	James O' Connor	The pavilion displayed Ireland's main contributions to human progress. There was also a typical Irish pub where the best-known beers and spirits from the country were promoted.
Italy	Permanent	Gae Aulenti, Pierluigi Spadolini	The Pavilion of Italy was one of the largest pavilions and featured a broad exposition on Italian Art, Invention, and Discovery. The building is today an administrative centre for numerous corporations and businesses.
Israel	Ephemeral X	Uri Shaviv	The pavilion of Israel represented of the exodus of the Jewish people for two thousand years and its coming together as a result of the creation of the State of Israel.
Hungary	Ephemeral	Imre Makovecz	The pavilion was built of wood and covered with slate, making its exterior appearance resemble a Hungarian rural church, with seven towers. Although it was originally designed as a temporary building, it still stands today. In 2007, it was declared a Bien de Interés Cultural for its architectural significance.
Japan	Ephemeral X	Tadao Ando	Japan featured the world's largest wooden structure, with a large escalator that took visitors up into the heart of the structure, from where they could descend into the lower levels of the inside the multi-level pavilion. Outside the pavilion, one could see a snapshot of Japanese society in the queue, featuring life-size photo portraits of Japanese persons in their respective professions. Also featured a three-segmented moving anime movie on Japan at the time of Columbus as seen by Don Quixote, and a scale representation of the top floors of a Japanese castle.
Kuwait	Ephemeral	Santiago Calatrava	Its most unique and characteristic element is a roof with 17 mobile wooden arms, which when open reach 25 metres (82 ft) height. Although it was originally designed as a temporary building, it houses today the Environment and Water Agency of the regional government.
Luxembourg	Ephemeral X	Paczowski-Fritch and Associates	Various projections showed everyday life in Luxembourg as well as the country's close relationship with rural landscapes and the steel industry. Visitors also had access to a financial simulation video game, which tested their financial skills.
Malaysia	Ephemeral X	Kumpulan Jetson	The pavilion showcased Malaysia's main resources: the timber and rubber industries, tourism and its national car: Proton Saga.
Mauritania	Ephemeral X	Eulalia A. Marqués Garrido	Inside the pavilion, all aspects of the daily life of the nomadic tribes were shown through typical objects.
Mexico	Permanent	Pedro Ramírez Vázquez	The pavilion ends on one side with a 18 metres (59 ft) high double cross that, in addition to recalling the X of Mexico, symbolizes the crossing and integration of cultures. After the exhibition it has housed different companies.
Monaco	Permanent	Fabrice Notari	The pavilion contained an aquarium displaying the flora and fauna of the Monegasque coastline. The building houses today an aquatic ecology research center.
Morocco	Permanent	Michel Pinseau	Considered one of the most beautiful pavilions at the expo, this pavilion was styled as a three-storied traditional Moroccan Palace-Mansion, with jewel-like fountain in the centre, and open to the sky atrium and restaurant. The building houses today the Fundación Tres Culturas.
Netherlands	Ephemeral ↑	Fred Temme, Moshé Zwarts, Rein Jansma	The façades of the pavilion were made of a synthetic material through which water flowed continuously, making it completely transparent. The building was dismantled after the exhibition and rebuilt in Alphen Aan Den Rijn where it was in use for a few years after which it was finally demolished due to high maintenance costs.
New Zealand	Ephemeral	Peter Hill	The pavilion of New Zealand featured the exhibition Treasures of the Underworld, performances by Māori kapa haka groups, and a performance by the opera singer Kiri Te Kanawa on New Zealand Day. Although it was originally designed as a temporary building, it houses today the Instituto de Estadística y Cartografía de Andalucía.
Norway	Ephemeral X	Paul Henry Engh	An ice portico welcomed visitors thanks to advanced freezing technology.
Oman	Ephemeral X	Azri Architects	The entrance to the pavilion was a replica of the gates of the walled city of Muscat.
Pakistan	Ephemeral X	Architectural Clinic	The pavilion was conceived as a large bazaar.
Papua New Guinea	Ephemeral X	David Richardson	The pavilion resembled a Haus Tambaran. It contained a cave and a waterfall reproducing the natural environment of the county.
Philippines	Ephemeral X	Francisco Mañosa	The pavilion looked like a typical Philippine country manor house, where the main element was a tower made up of stained coloured shells.
Portugal	Permanent	Manuel Graca Dias, Egas José Vieira	The pavilion had a high historical content on the era of navigators and the voyages to the New World. The building houses today the Energy Agency of the regional government.
Puerto Rico	Permanent	Segundo Cardona, Luis Sierra, Alberto Ferrer	Puerto Rico (a U.S. territory) participated in Expo '92 with a separate pavilion from that of the United States. The US$31 million pavilion (equivalent to $71 million in 2025), which was much larger and more ornate than the U.S. pavilion, was seen as one of several large projects undertaken by pro-Commonwealth governor Rafael Hernández Colón to underscore Puerto Rico's cultural and historical links to Latin America, Spain, and Europe. The Wall Street Journal Europe described the Puerto Rican National Pavilion as: "a stunning mix of three geometric 'volumes': a triangle of stone with large perforations based on sentry posts in military fortifications on the island, a modernistic white porcelain pergola, and a sleek copper-clad cylinder. Around the pavilion are transplanted palms that grown only on Puerto Rico, Roystonea borinquena. Caribbean coral will decorate the bottom of the reflecting pool around the buildings." After the expo, Puerto Rico sold the pavilion for US$4 million ($9.2 million in 2025) to Correos, the Spanish postal service, for use as a training facility. The building houses today an agency of the regional government.
Romania	Ephemeral X	Alberto Carabie	The pavilion exhibited sculptures from the Neolithic period, reproductions of works from the 16th century, as well as models of national monuments.
Russia	Ephemeral X	Juris Poga, Aigars Sparans	The first representation by Russia in an universal exhibition after the Dissolution of the Soviet Union featured an angled pavilion with many coloured moving squares on its roof, which changed to represent different messages, i.e. the Russian Flag, the words 'Russia' and so on. Inside one could see aspects of the Russian space program and a full-scale replica of Sputnik 1 suspended from the pavilion ceiling.
Saudi Arabia	Ephemeral X	Fitch Benoy	The exhibition area was covered with a large canvas made up of more than 300 hand-woven Bedouin rugs.
Singapore	Ephemeral X	Conrad Design Pacific Ltd.	The pavilion looked like a typical Singaporean house and was crowned with a canopy in the shape of a palm tree. Merlion welcomed visitors.
South Africa	Ephemeral X	Reiner Kohl	The pavilion displayed archaeological artifacts; pieces of gold, diamonds and other precious stones; and contemporary works of art and ceramic objects.
South Korea	Ephemeral	Hak-Sun Oh	In the pavilion, Korean folk dances were performed every day. The building houses today a technology company.
Spain	Permanent	Julio Cano Lasso	The flagship Pavilion of Spain was noted for its strikingly simplistic and modernistic cube and sphere, located dramatically on the edge of the artificial Lake of Spain and along the Road of the Discoveries and the end of the Avenue of Europe. The cube of the pavilion hosted a unique gathering of the best of Spanish art, including works by Velázquez, Goya, El Greco, Murillo, Sorolla, Miró, Picasso, Dalí, and others, and the dome of the pavilion hosted an Iwerks 15/70 Dome moving seat theatre presentation, which took one on a simulated tour of some of the best sights of Spain. The pavilion restaurant was also highly rated. The building houses today the offices of Isla Mágica.
Sri Lanka	Ephemeral X	José Antonio Obregón	A reproduction of the Avukana Buddha statue presided over the façade of the building,
Sweden	Ephemeral ↑	Alenius, Silfverhielm, Ahlund	Among the many Swedish inventions on display at the pavilion were the refrigerator, invented by Electrolux in 1922; the three-point seat belt, developed by Volvo; as well as the Celsius thermometer and the dynamite, invented by Alfred Nobel, who later created the prizes that bear his name. The building was dismantled after the exhibition and rebuilt in Grythyttan where it houses the gastronomy school of the Örebro University.
Switzerland	Ephemeral X	Vicent Mangeat	The pavilion had a 39 metres (128 ft) high white tower made of recyclable and biodegradable cardboard.
Thailand	Ephemeral X	Prajade Thiravat	The pavilion was crowned with a reproduction of a part of the Grand Palace in Bangkok.
Tunisia	Ephemeral X	Abdelhamid Ayadi	The pavilion displayed various mosaics, Tunisian archaeological pieces, ancient Islamic objects, as well as an exhibition of maritime maps and views of the country's ports. A large screen showed the main landscapes of the country and recreated the living room of a typical village house.
Turkey	Permanent	Oner Tokcan, Hulusi I Gonul, C. Ilder Tokcan	The highlight of the pavilion of Turkey was an interactive promotional software which was presenting Turkish tourism sector, cultural values and economical opportunities. The visitors interacted with this multimedia software via large touchscreen monitors and the application was awarded "the best use of multimedia" award of the expo. The building houses today the offices of an international foundation.
United Kingdom	Ephemeral ↑	Nicholas Grimshaw & Partners	This pavilion, made up of a large iron and glass structure, stood out for the artificial waterfall that covered the main façade and in which the British flag could be seen through the water. The building was dismantled after the exhibition and stored awaiting destination.
United Arab Emirates	Ephemeral X	Marqués, Garcés and Associates	The pavilion replicated the Al Jahili Fort in Al Ain.
United States	Ephemeral X	Carlos Langdon Ruiz y Myers	The pavilion was funded by Amway, General Motors, and many other corporate sponsors, as part of a Public-private partnership. It featured on the outside a Space Age depiction of the U.S. flag, in three large suspended structures, which could be seen from many angles from afar, and a large modern mural by the German-American artist Peter Max, depicting the history of discovery from the voyage of Christopher Columbus and his encounter with the American continent, to the Space Shuttle. The pavilion itself consisted of several structures: a large cinema presentation World Song produced by Bob Rogers and the design team BRC Imagination Arts, for General Motors which explored the common stages of life among all nations and people. During the run of the expo, the film also played to an international audience at AmeriFlora '92, an international horticultural exhibition held in Columbus, Ohio. Other exhibits at the pavilion included the Bill of Rights exhibition, and the Freedom House, a working modern American home that could be visited.
Venezuela	Ephemeral X	Enrique Hernández	In its auditorium, a 15-minute long 70mm film entitled Venezuela, Tierra de Gracia was played, with a script by Arturo Uslar Pietri and produced by Venevisión, which showed the country's cultural and scenic heritage.
Yugoslavia	Ephemeral X	David Misa	Yugoslavia had it own pavilion at the Expo. United Nations Security Council Resolution 757 was adopted during the Expo, but the organisers decided not to close Yugoslavian pavilion, although all official events were canceled. On 2 October, the pavilion was visited by Queen Sofia and Princess Irene.
Shared pavilions
Bulgaria	Ephemeral (Note: Ephemeral building shared between Bulgaria and Poland.) X	Fernando Mendoza Castells	Among the artifacts on display were gold pieces from the two most important Bulgarian collections: the Varna and Valchitran Treasures.
Poland	Ephemeral X	Fernando Mendoza Castells	The pavilion featured the Polish computer encyclopaedia.
Plaza de América
Argentina	Ephemeral in Plaza de América (Note: Although all the pavilions in Plaza de América were ephemeral stands, they were located in a shared permanent building designed by Jesús Castañón Díaz, Ernesto Sánchez Zapata, and Eduardo Gómez García. The building houses today the engineering school of the University of Seville.) X		
Bolivia	Ephemeral in Plaza de América X		
Brazil	Ephemeral in Plaza de América X		
Colombia	Ephemeral in Plaza de América X		
Costa Rica	Ephemeral in Plaza de América X		The Pavilion of Costa Rica was designed by Carlos Valenzuela Fonseca.
Dominican Republic	Ephemeral in Plaza de América X		
Ecuador	Ephemeral in Plaza de América X		
El Salvador	Ephemeral in Plaza de América X		
Guatemala	Ephemeral in Plaza de América X		
Haiti	Ephemeral in Plaza de América X		
Honduras	Ephemeral in Plaza de América X		
Nicaragua	Ephemeral in Plaza de América X		
Panama	Ephemeral in Plaza de América X		
Paraguay	Ephemeral in Plaza de América X		
Peru	Ephemeral in Plaza de América X		
Uruguay	Ephemeral in Plaza de América X		
Plaza de África
Angola	Ephemeral in Plaza de África (Note: Although all the pavilions in Plaza de África were ephemeral stands, they were located in a shared permanent building designed by Álvaro Navarro and Miguel M. de Castilla. The building houses today the Confederation of Businessmen of Andalusia.) X		
Cabo Verde	Ephemeral in Plaza de África X		
Cameroon	Ephemeral in Plaza de África X		
Congo	Ephemeral in Plaza de África X		
Côte d'Ivoire	Ephemeral in Plaza de África X		
Equatorial Guinea	Ephemeral in Plaza de África X		
Gabon	Ephemeral in Plaza de África X		
Guinea-Bissau	Ephemeral in Plaza de África X		
Kenya	Ephemeral in Plaza de África X		
Mozambique	Ephemeral in Plaza de África X		
Nigeria	Ephemeral in Plaza de África X		
São Tomé and Príncipe	Ephemeral in Plaza de África X		
Senegal	Ephemeral in Plaza de África X		
Zimbabue	Ephemeral in Plaza de África X		
Pavilion of the Arab States
Egypt	Ephemeral in the Pavilion of the Arab States (Note: All the pavilions in the Pavilion of the Arab States were ephemeral stands located in a shared ephemeral building designed by Jesús Castañón Díaz, Rafael Zapata, and Eduardo Gómez.) X		
Jordan	Ephemeral in the Pavilion of the Arab States X		
Syria	Ephemeral in the Pavilion of the Arab States X		
Pavilion of the Baltic Republics
Estonia	Ephemeral in the Pavilion of the Baltic Republics (Note: All the pavilions in the Pavilion of the Baltic Republics were ephemeral stands located in a shared ephemeral marquee designed by Sandro Lomoro. The marquee was dismantled after the exhibition, sold, and rebuilt in Madrid.) X		
Latvia	Ephemeral in the Pavilion of the Baltic Republics X		
Lithuania	Ephemeral in the Pavilion of the Baltic Republics X		
Pavilion of the Caribbean
Antigua and Barbuda	Ephemeral in the Pavilion of the Caribbean (Note: All the pavilions in the Pavilion of the Caribbean were ephemeral stands located in a shared ephemeral building designed by Jesús Castañón Díaz, Ernesto Sánchez Zapata, and Eduardo Gómez García.) X		
Bahamas	Ephemeral in the Pavilion of the Caribbean X		
Dominica	Ephemeral in the Pavilion of the Caribbean X		
Grenada	Ephemeral in the Pavilion of the Caribbean X		
Jamaica	Ephemeral in the Pavilion of the Caribbean X		The pavilion was sponsored by Jamaican Government and the private sector. The concept for the pavilion was a country bus tour taking you through the Jamaican countryside to a village square surrounded by shop frontages which contained the products of the sponsors. The theme was designed by architect Michael Lake and the artwork and construction was done by Will Robson, Margaret Robson and Umbala at the Magic Toys Workshop in Walderston, Jamaica.
Montserrat	Ephemeral in the Pavilion of the Caribbean X		
Saint Kitts and Nevis	Ephemeral in the Pavilion of the Caribbean X		
Saint Lucia	Ephemeral in the Pavilion of the Caribbean X		
Saint Vincent and the Grenadines	Ephemeral in the Pavilion of the Caribbean X		
Trinidad and Tobago	Ephemeral in the Pavilion of the Caribbean X		
Pavilion of the South Pacific Islands
Fiji	Ephemeral in the Pavilion of the South Pacific Islands (Note: All the pavilions in the Pavilion of the South Pacific Islands were ephemeral stands located in a shared ephemeral building designed by Stuart Huggett.) X		
Kiribati	Ephemeral in the Pavilion of the South Pacific Islands X		
Vanuatu	Ephemeral in the Pavilion of the South Pacific Islands X		

=== Regional pavilions ===
Country	Type	Architect(s)	Description
Andalusia	Permanent	Juan Ruesga Navarro	The pavilion had a 360-degree cinema, a television studio, a radio studio, and an exhibition with Andalusian works of art. Particularly noteworthy were the ceiling frescoes painted by Guillermo Pérez Villalta. Next to the pavilion was the Andalusia for children outdoor park with 1:33 scale models of the region's monuments. The building houses today the headquarters of Radio y Televisión de Andalucía.
Aragon	Ephemeral ↑	José María López Latorre	The building is made up of a large dome enclosed between two large alabaster walls, a material from La Zaida. The translucency of the alabaster allows the filtered passage of light. The building was dismantled after the exhibition and rebuilt in Zaragoza where it houses today the Confederation of Businessmen of Aragon.
Asturias	Ephemeral ↑	Ramón Muñoz, Antonio Sanmartín	The building was dismantled after the exhibition and rebuilt in Gijón where it houses today the Museum of the Asturian People.
Balearic Islands	Ephemeral X	Miguel Vicens Coll	The pavilion consisted of a fully glazed building with sails deployed on its main façade resembling a sailboat.
Basque Country	Ephemeral X	Luis Angoloti, Apolinario Fernández de Sousa	The building looked like a large glass Ikurriña that was completely illuminated at nightfall with the colours of the Basque flag.
Canary Islands	Ephemeral X	José Manuel Barrio, César Mezquita	A scale representation of the Cueva del Viento in Tenerife stood out.
Cantabria	Ephemeral X	Ricardo Piqueras, Alain Pelissier, Arnaund Sompairae	The pavilion housed a reproduction of the Cave of Altamira and an exhibition on Juan de la Cosa.
Castile–La Mancha	Ephemeral X	Jaime Lorenzo, Manuel de las Casas, Ignacio de las Casas	Its content revolved around Don Quixote. It also housed an exhibition of paintings by renowned artists.
Castile and León	Ephemeral X	Josefina González Cubero, José María Martínez	
Catalonia	Ephemeral X	Pere Llimona, Xavier Ruiz	On its façade, a mural by Antoni Tàpies stood out with the name of the pavilion.
Extremadura	Ephemeral X	Tomás Vicente Curbelo, Juan José García Viondi	Its content revolved around the figures of Extremadurans linked to the conquest of the American continent, such as Hernán Cortés and Francisco Pizarro.
Galicia	Ephemeral ↑	José Antonio Franco Taboada	The pavilion promoted the Compostelan Jubilee year to be celebrated in 1993 and the Camino de Santiago. The building was dismantled after the exhibition and rebuilt in Santiago de Compostela where it has housed different offices of the regional government.
La Rioja	Ephemeral X	R. Gonzalo Zarandona, J. Torres Castillo	Among the artefacts on display was a facsimile of the Glosas Emilianenses, and preserved footprints of dinosaurs that inhabited the region. There was a wine cellar in its basement.
Community of Madrid	Ephemeral X	José Luis Solans, Ricardo del Amo, Pilar Briales	In its auditorium, Salomé, a short film by Pedro Almodóvar, was played.
Region of Murcia	Ephemeral X	Vicente Martínez Gadea	A large floral mantle covered its façade, symbolizing the region's orchard.
Navarre	Ephemeral X	Fernando Rendón Huici	On the steps of the pavilion there was a cascading stream with trouts between beech trees and rocks brought from Navarre. In its auditorium, a 3D film about the region was played.
Valencian Community	Ephemeral X	Emilio Giménez	

=== International organisations pavilions ===
Country	Type	Architect(s)	Description
Arab League	Ephemeral in the Pavilion of the Arab States X		This pavilion presented the numerous contributions of Arab civilization to Spanish cultural heritage.
European Community	Permanent, individual	Karsten K. Krebs	The European Community and the Nations of the European Community, were all located along the Avenue of Europe, which featured twelve massive white-coloured towers, and a central multi-coloured tower featuring the flags of the (then) twelve nations of the European Community, which underground hosted the Pavilion of the European Community itself. The building houses today the offices of the Cartuja Science and Technology Park.
International Olympic Committee	Ephemeral, individual	Rafael de La-Hoz Castanys, Pedro Ramírez Vázquez	It was designed inspired by a Greek temple, symbol of the origins of Olympism. Although it was originally designed as a temporary building, it houses today a nightclub and restaurant.
International Red Cross and Red Crescent Movement	Permanent, individual X	Miguel Martínez Garrido	The tour of the pavilion showed the humanitarian work of the movement. Volunteers accompanied visitors on their tour recounting their experiences as volunteers.
Inter-American System	Ephemeral in Plaza de América X		This pavilion represented the Inter-American Development Bank, the Organization of American States, the Pan American Health Organization, and the Inter-American Institute for Cooperation on Agriculture.
United Nations	Permanent, individual X	José Rodríguez Gautier	The tour of the pavilion was presented by a friendly alien who showed visitors the objectives of the UN and the thirty-five organizations that made up the UN system.

=== Corporate pavilions ===
Country	Type	Architect(s)	Description
Cruzcampo	Permanent	Miguel de Oriol e Ybarra	The pavilion housed a brewery, as well as the largest beer bar in Europe, with capacity for 800 people.
Fujitsu	Permanent	José Antonio de Aguinaga García, Sergio Casado Revuelta	The pavilion featured the 70mm IMAX 3D film Echoes of the Sun with the audience using e-liquid glasses. The building houses today an agency of the regional government.
ONCE	Permanent	Gilbert Barbany, Sebastián Mateli	The pavilion of the Spanish National Organization of the Blind (ONCE) was intended to raise awareness among visitors about the world of people with disabilities and was part of the marketing actions to the 1992 Summer Paralympics. The building houses today a business centre and is part of ONCE foundation.
Promesa	Ephemeral X	Christopher Boyce	The exhibition was organized around the audiovisual musical The Book of Seven Seals.
Rank Xerox	Permanent	Manuel Carrilero	The pavilion featured the "office of the future". The building houses today an engineering company.
Retevisión	Permanent	Horacio Domínguez López	The pavilion housed a HD-MAC television studio, and a HDTV demonstration room. The building and its HDTV studio is used today by Canal Sur.
Siemens	Permanent	Gunter R. Standke	The pavilion housed a screening room. The building houses today an engineering company.

=== Gallery ===
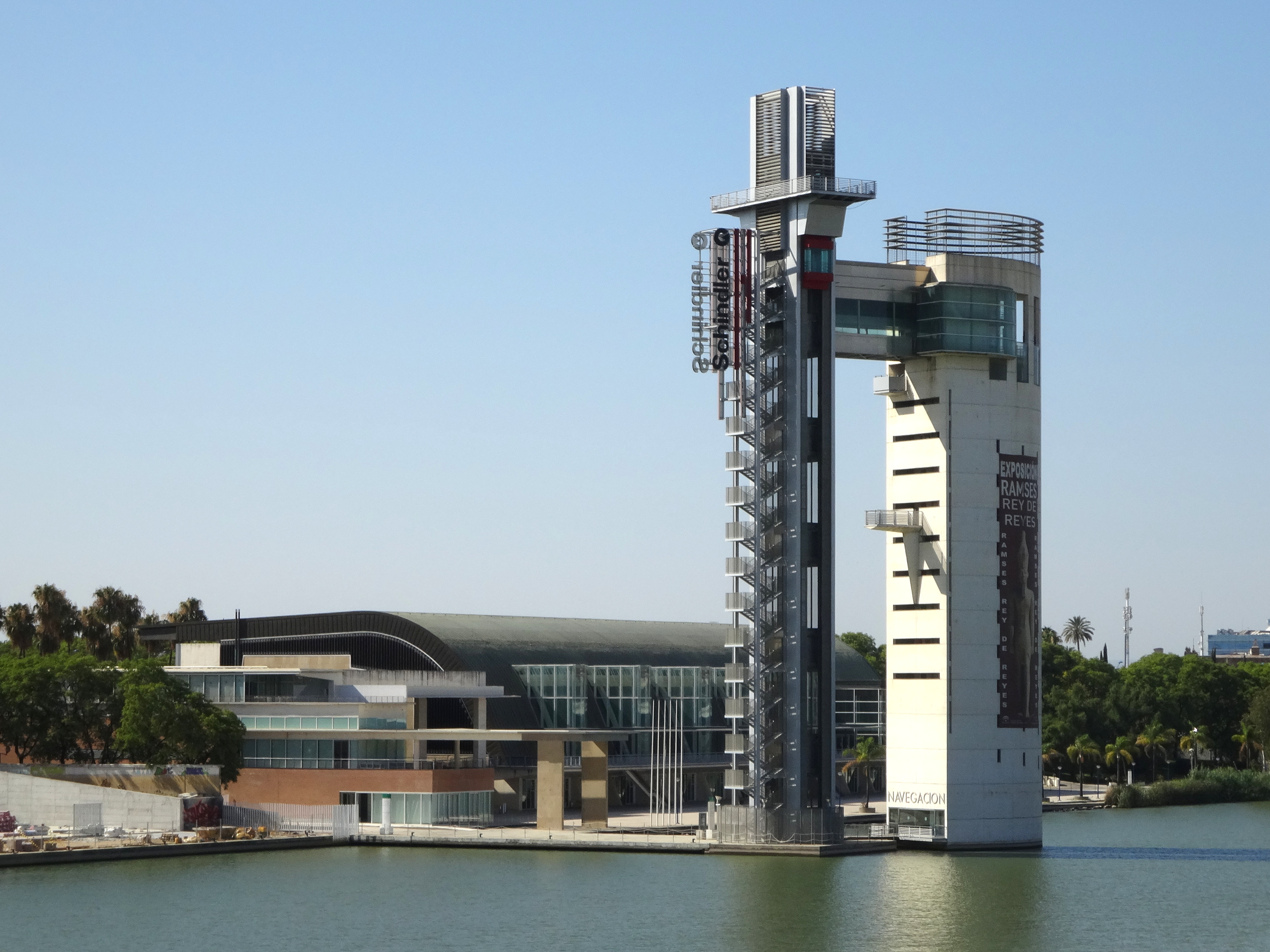
Pavilion of Navigation and Schindler Tower (Note: Picture taken years after the exhibition.)

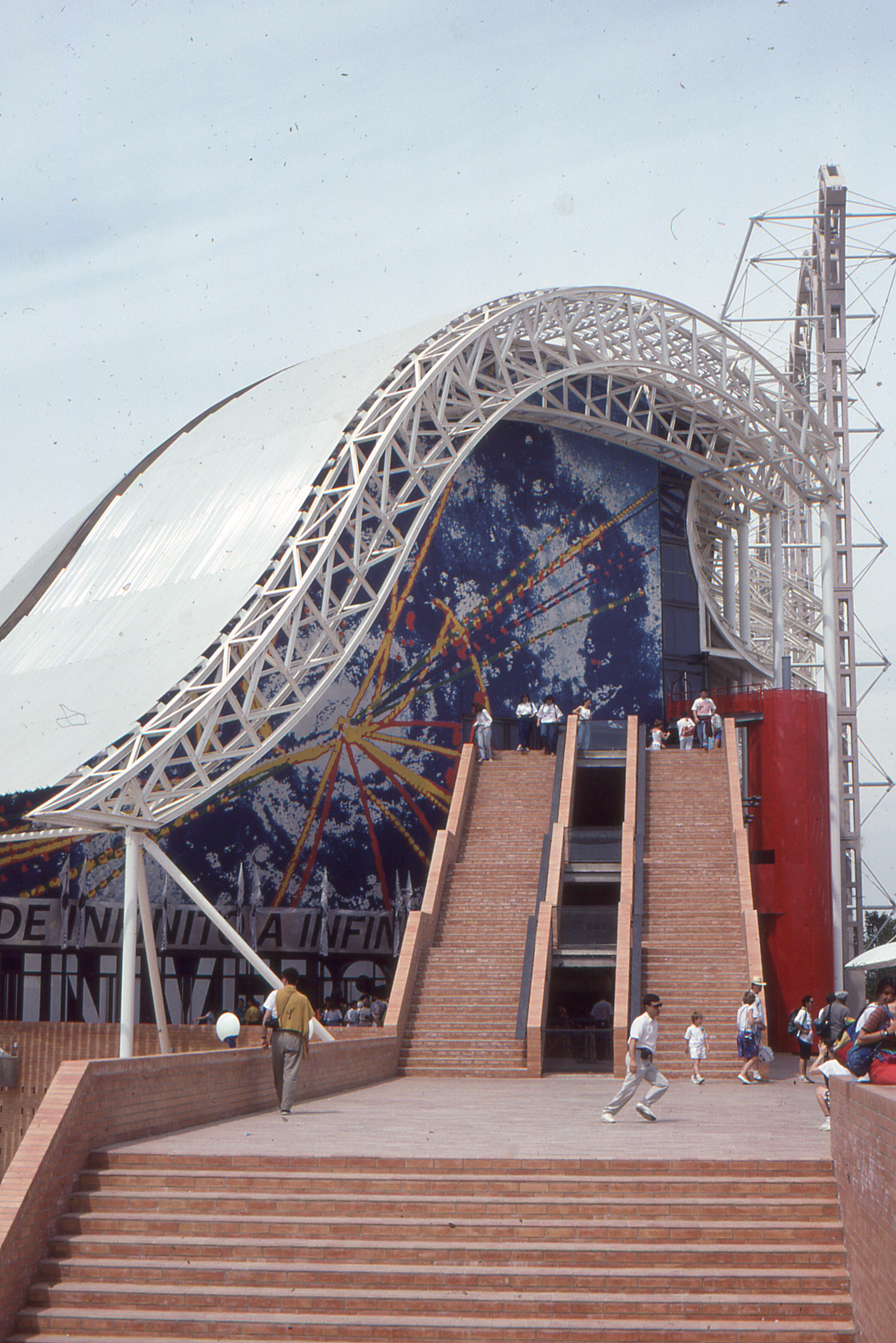
Pavilion of the Universe

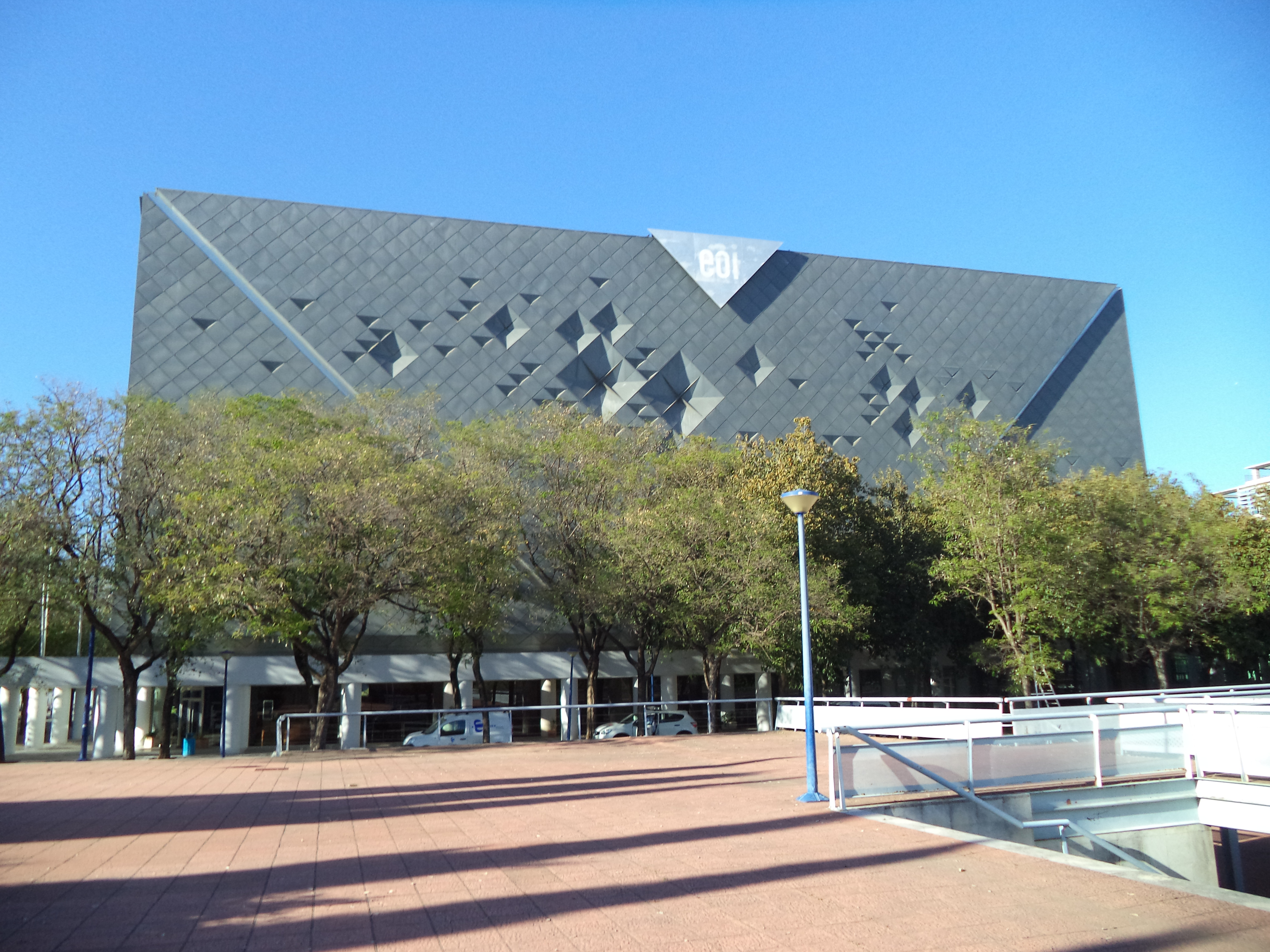
Pavilion of Canada

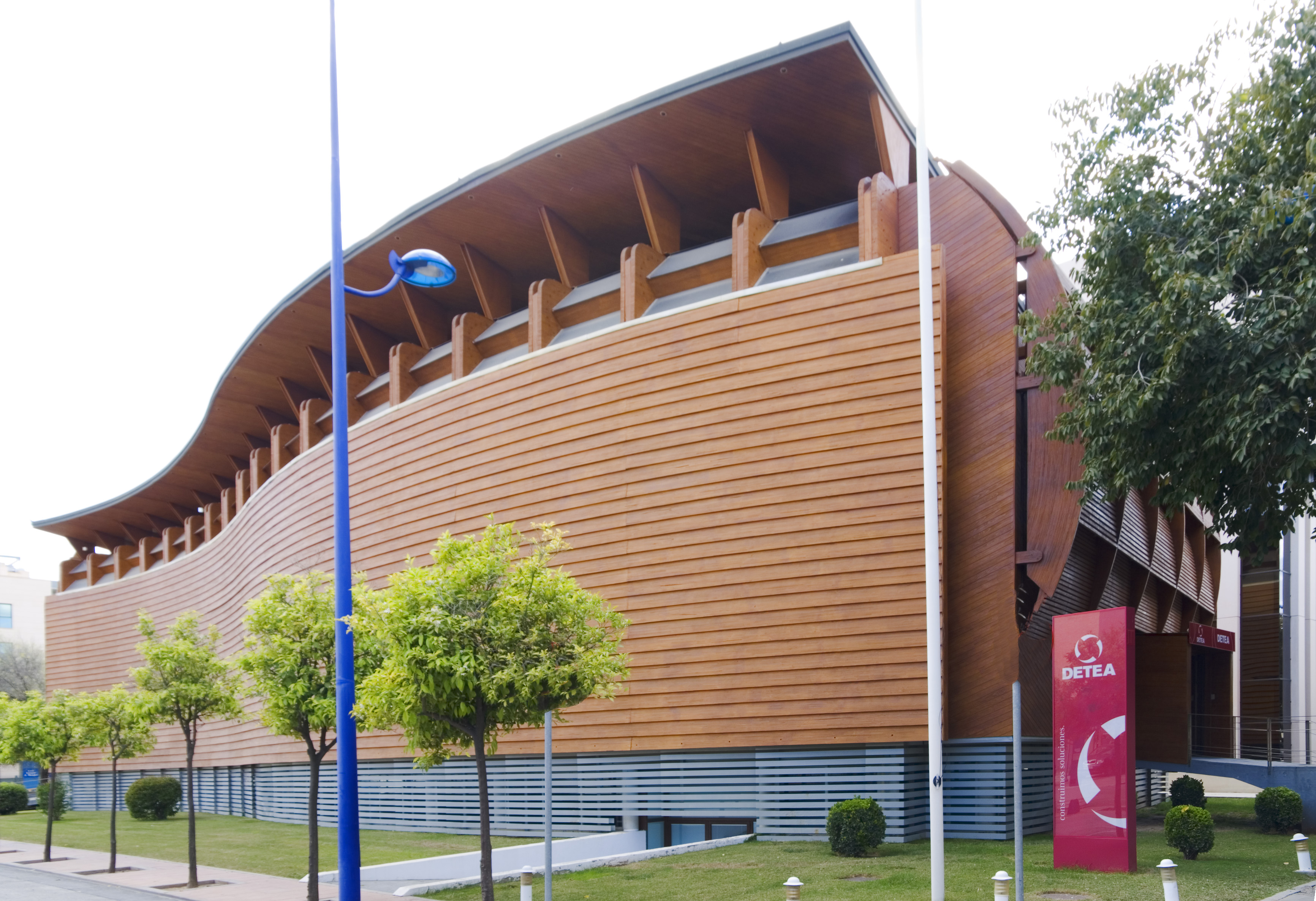
Pavilion of Chile

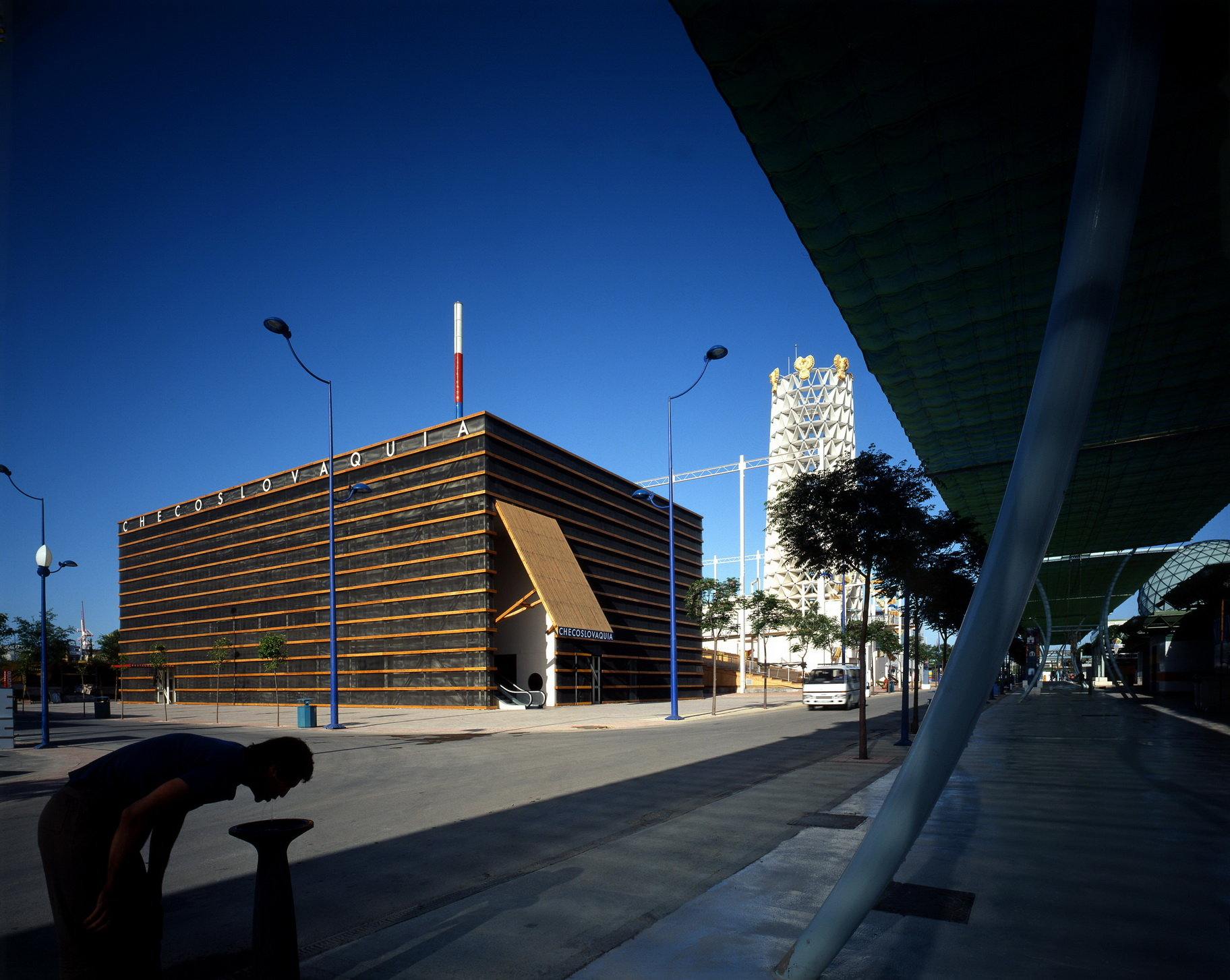
Pavilion of Czechoslovakia and Pavilion of Switzerland

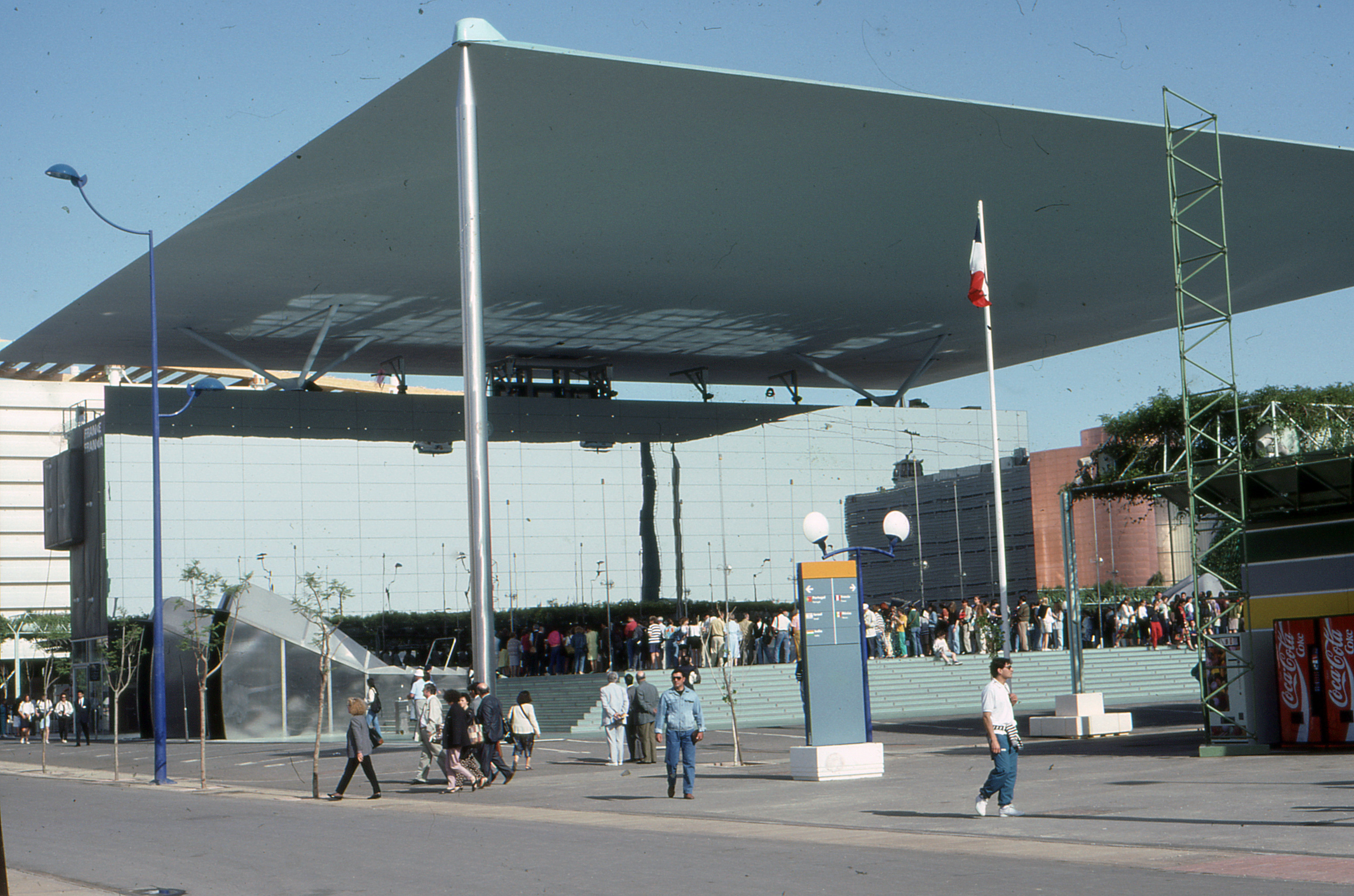
Pavilion of France

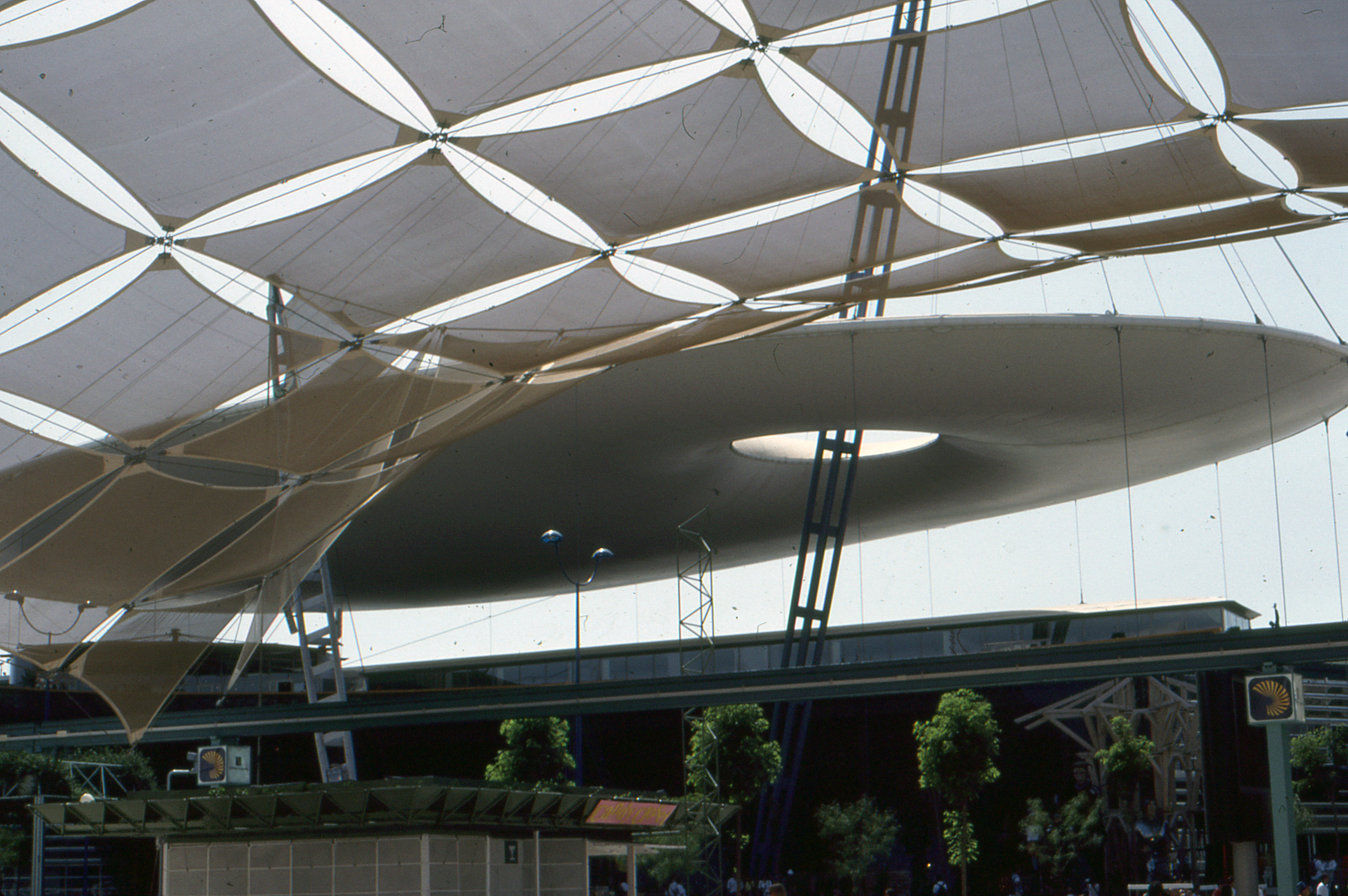
Pavilion of Germany

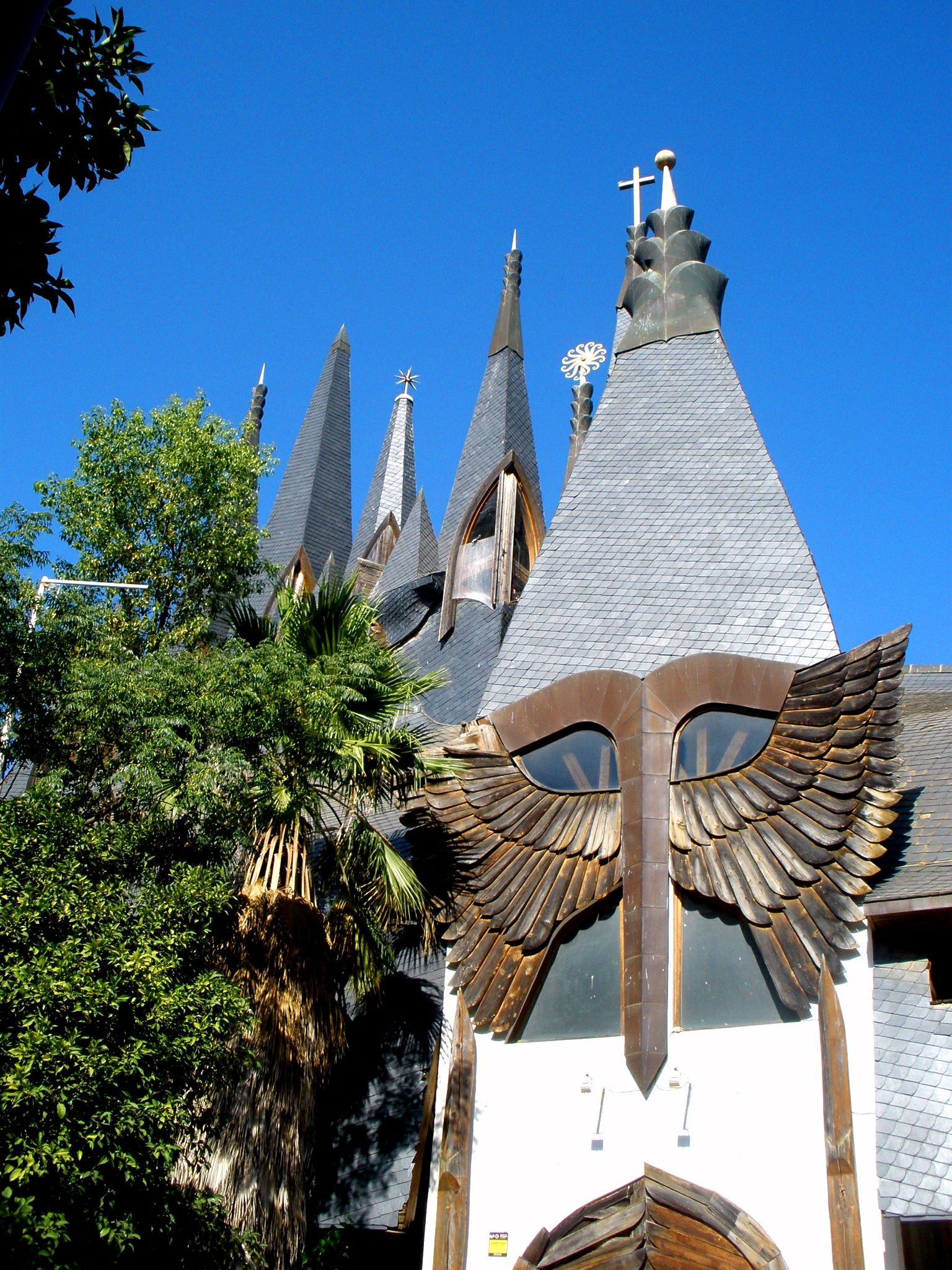
Pavilion of Hungary

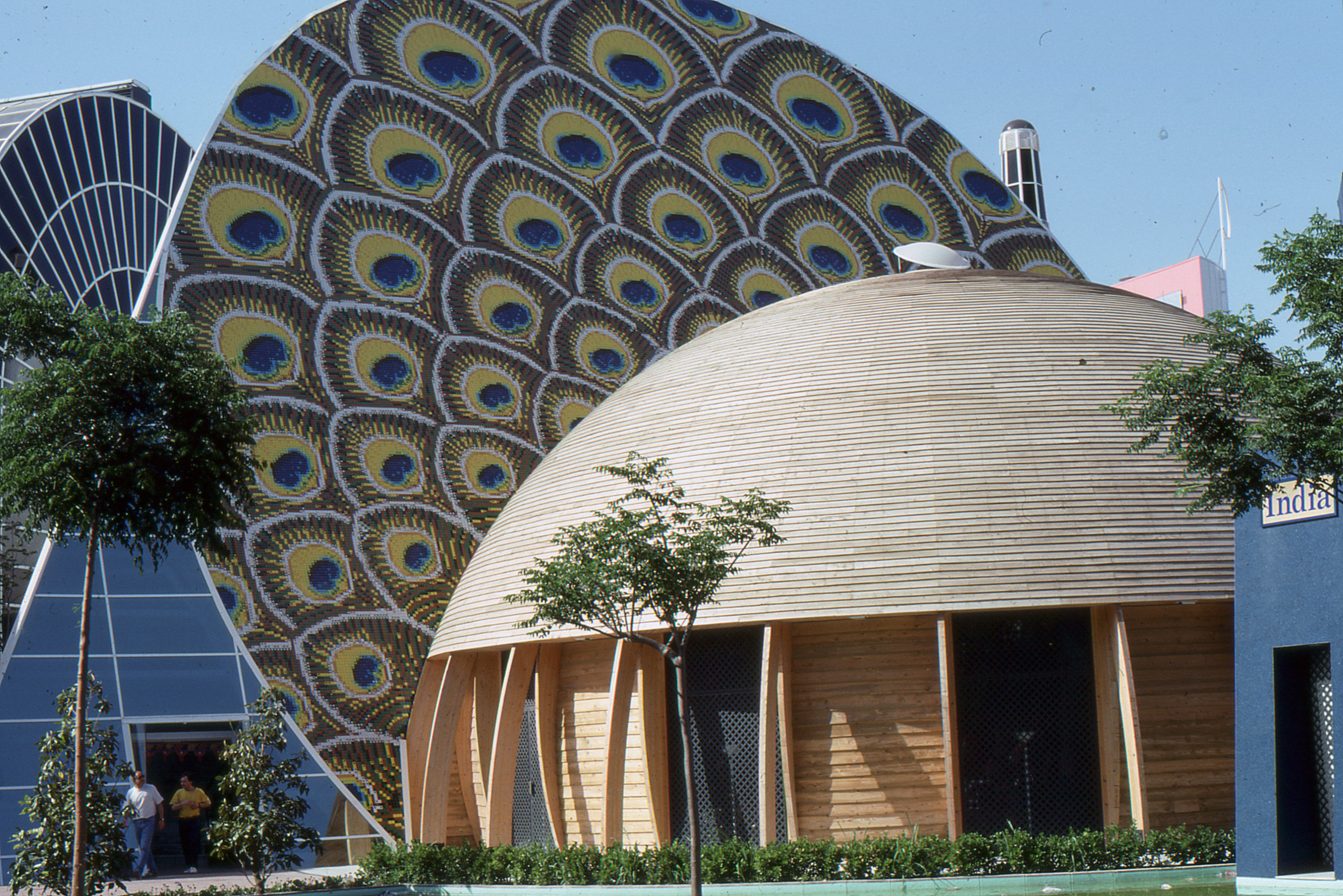
Pavilion of India

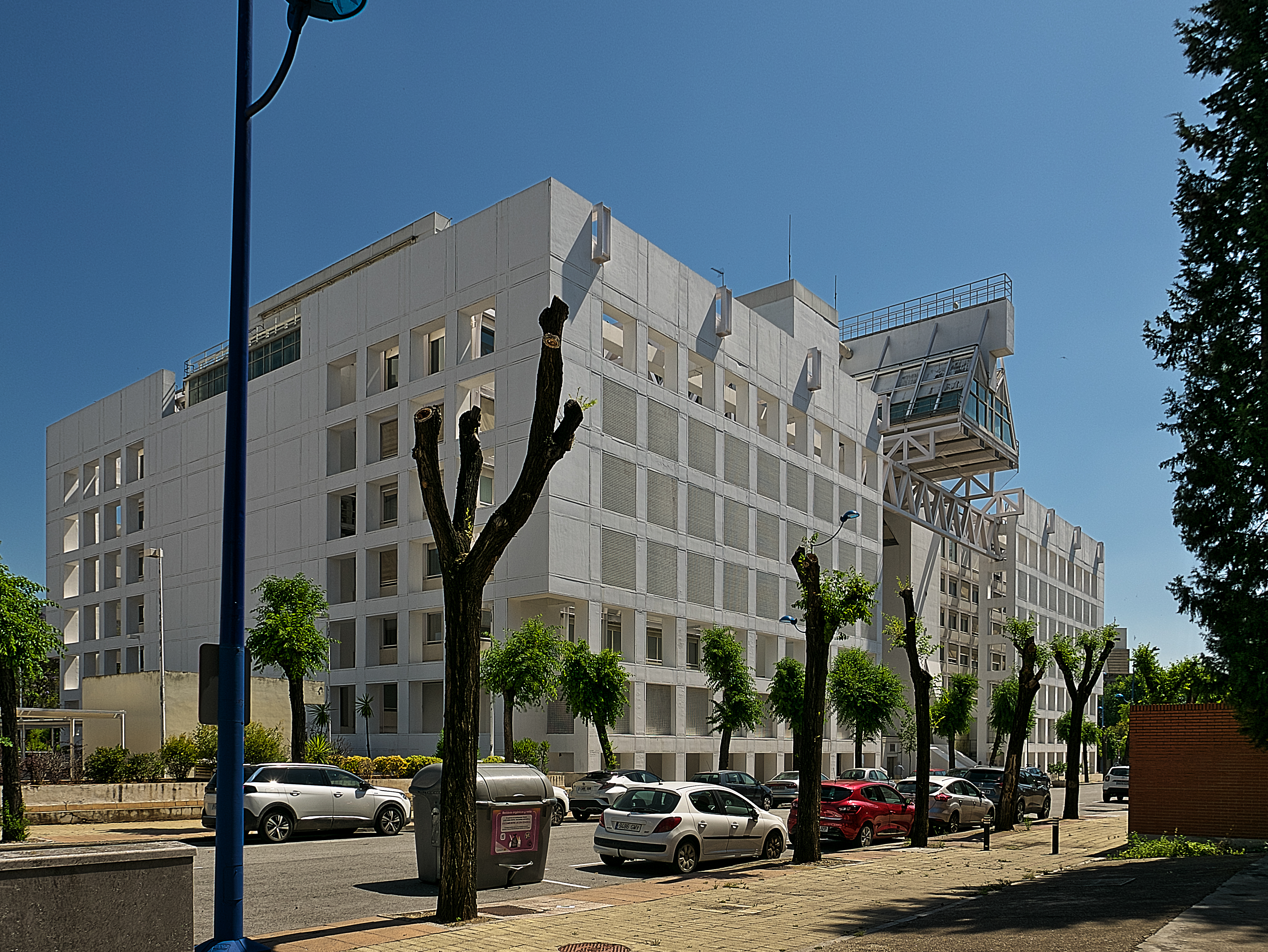
Pavilion of Italy

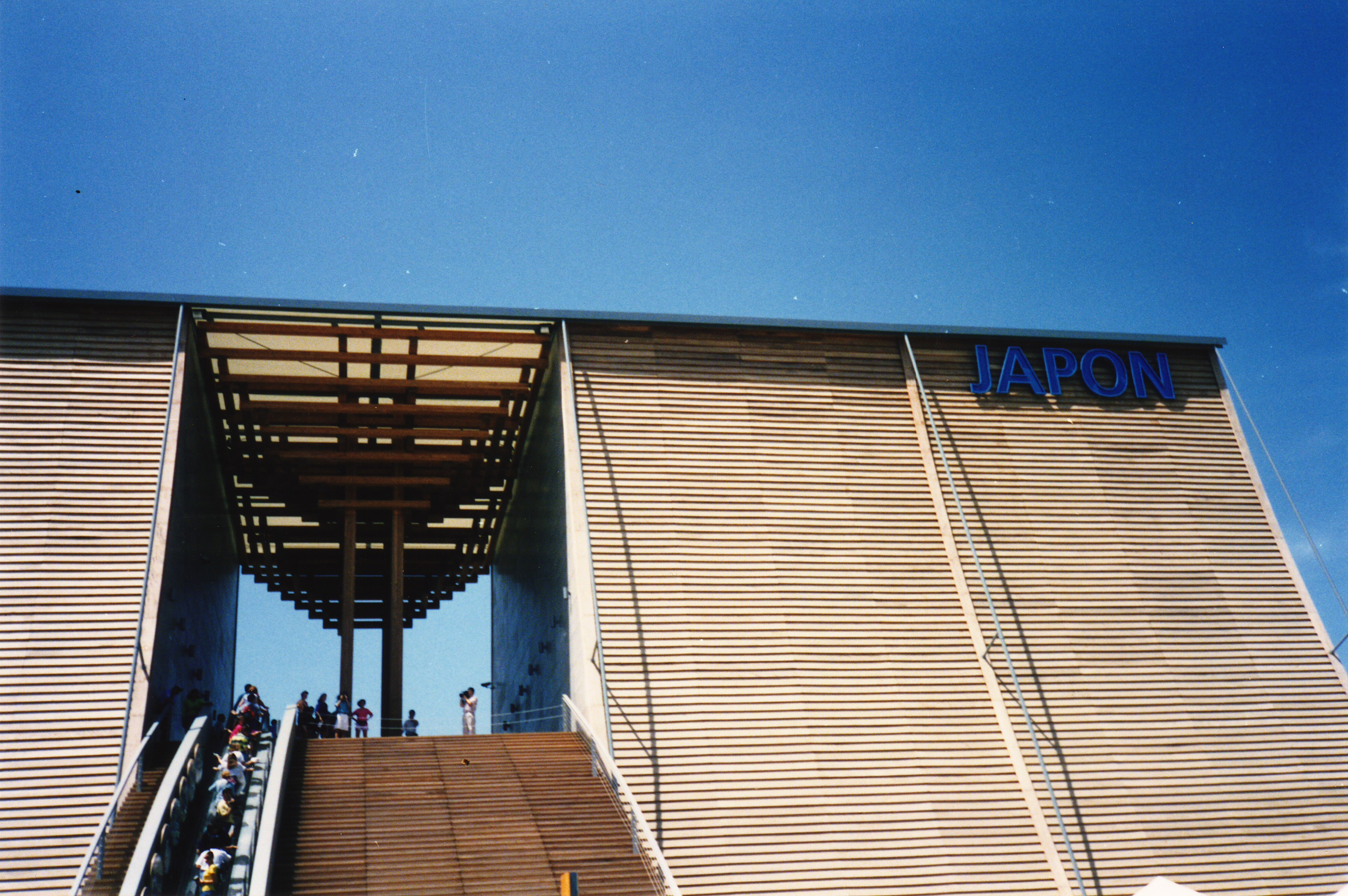
Pavilion of Japan

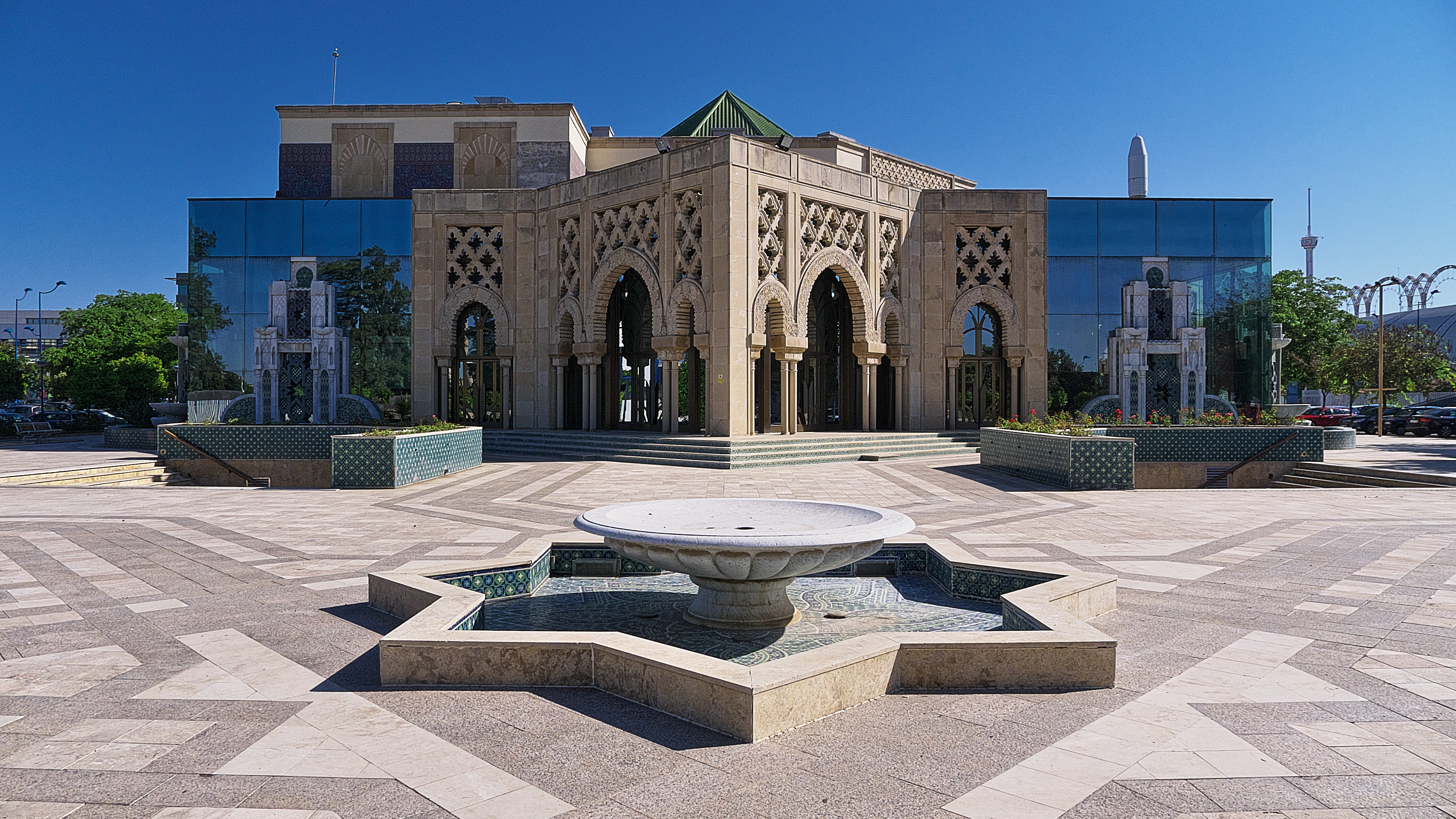
Pavilion of Morocco

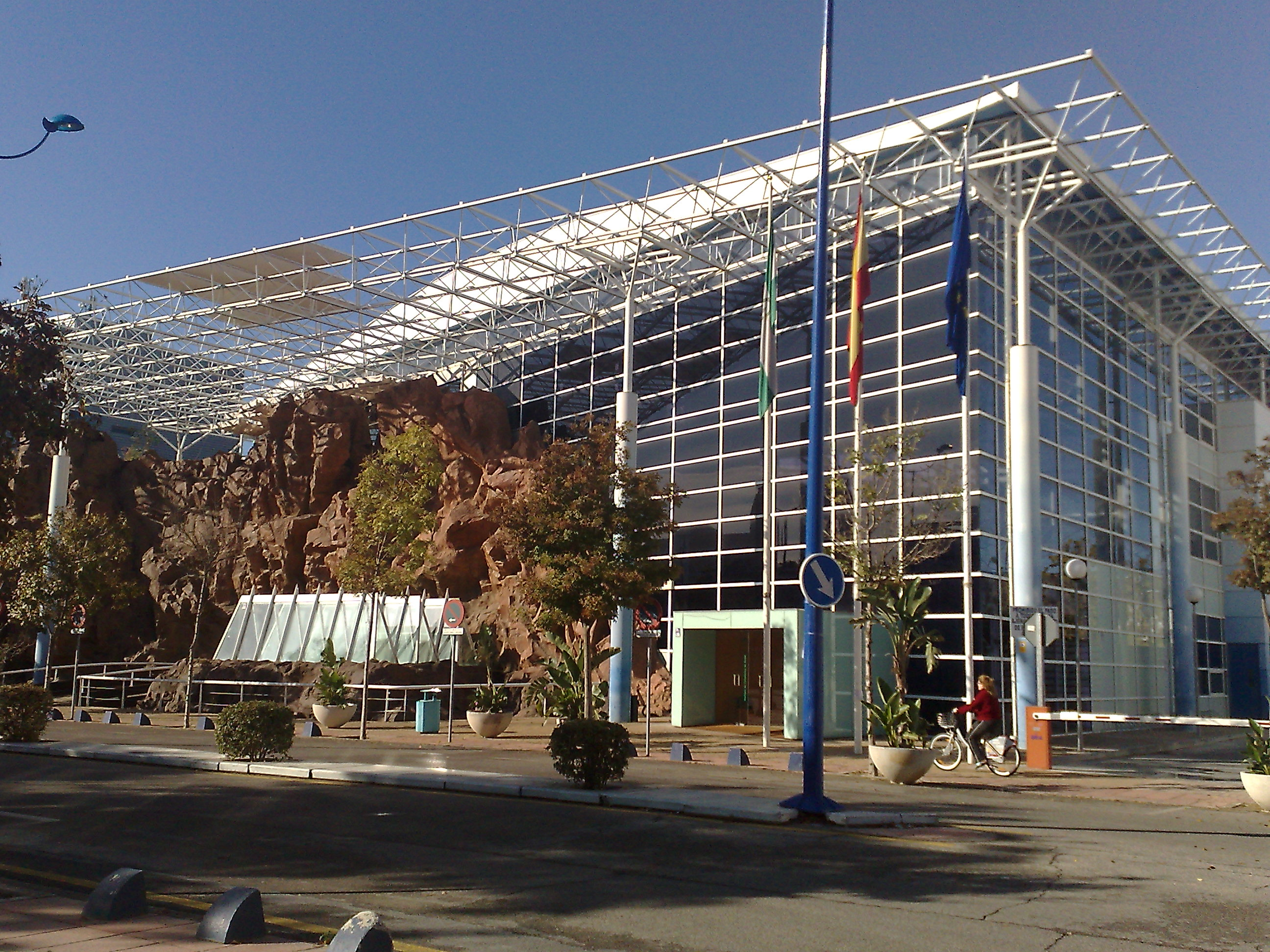
Pavilion of New Zealand

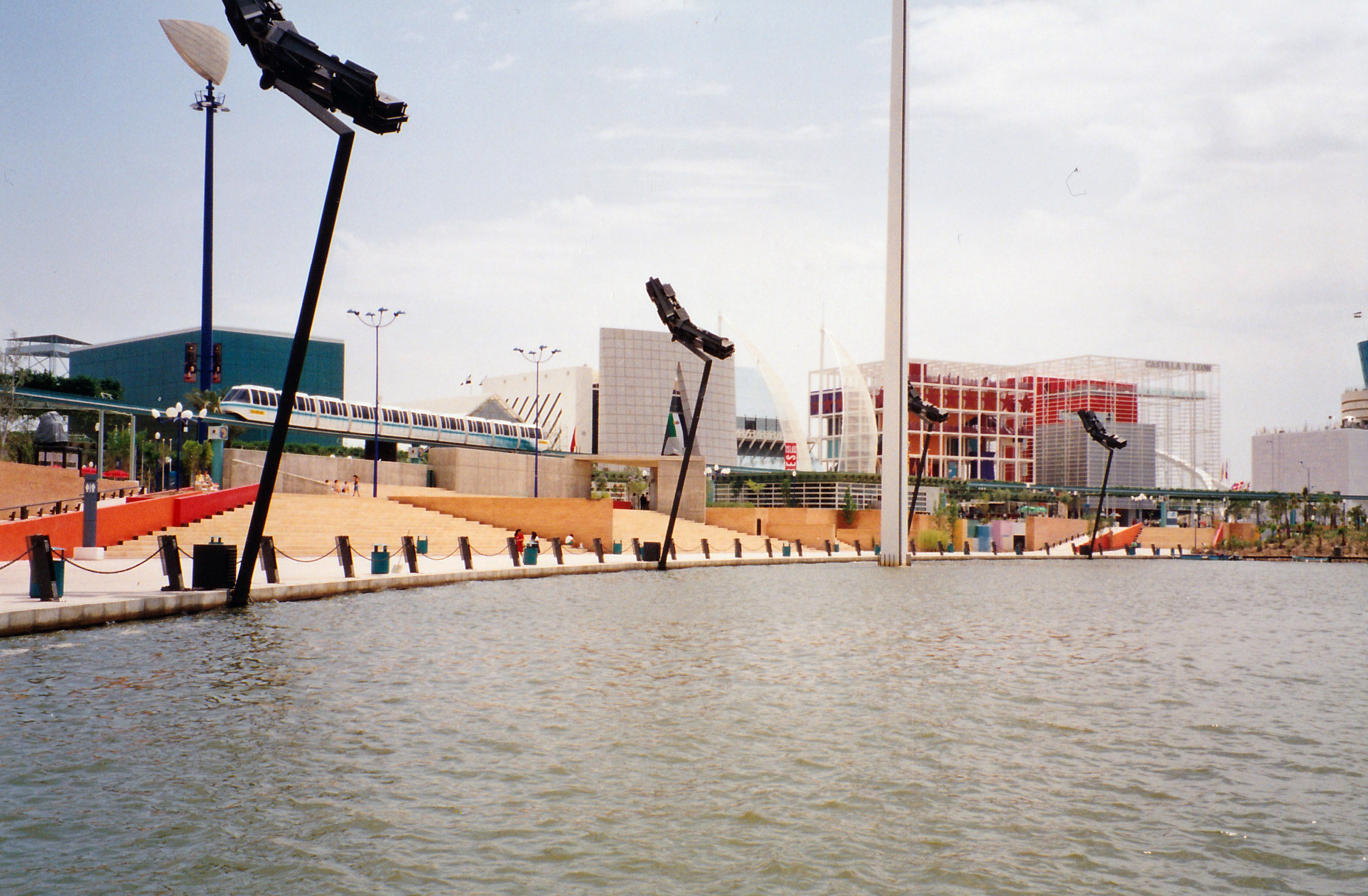
Some of the regional pavilions on the Lake of Spain

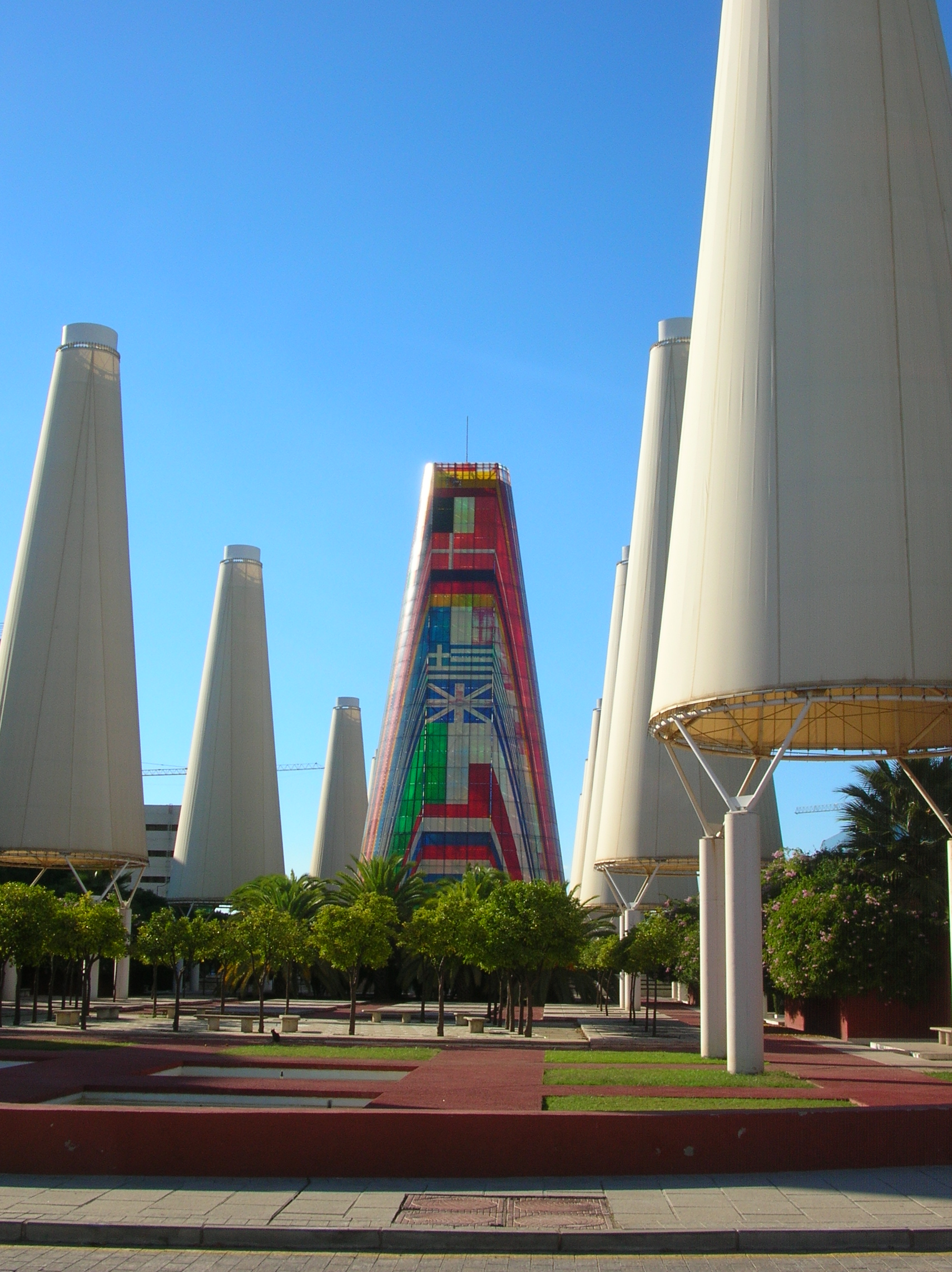
Pavilion of the European Community

== Mascot ==
Curro was the mascot for the fair. It has the shape of a big white bird with the legs of an elephant, whose long conical beak and crest had the colours of the rainbow. It was created by German designer Heinz Edelmann (who is best known for his work on the 1968 animated film, Yellow Submarine), who also gave it the name Curro, an Andalusian pet form of Spanish male name Francisco.

Curro was revealed on 14 March 1989 in Madrid, and he was officially presented in the Plaza de España of Seville, in a big fest of light and sound on 22 April 1989, three years before the fair's inauguration.

== Climate control ==
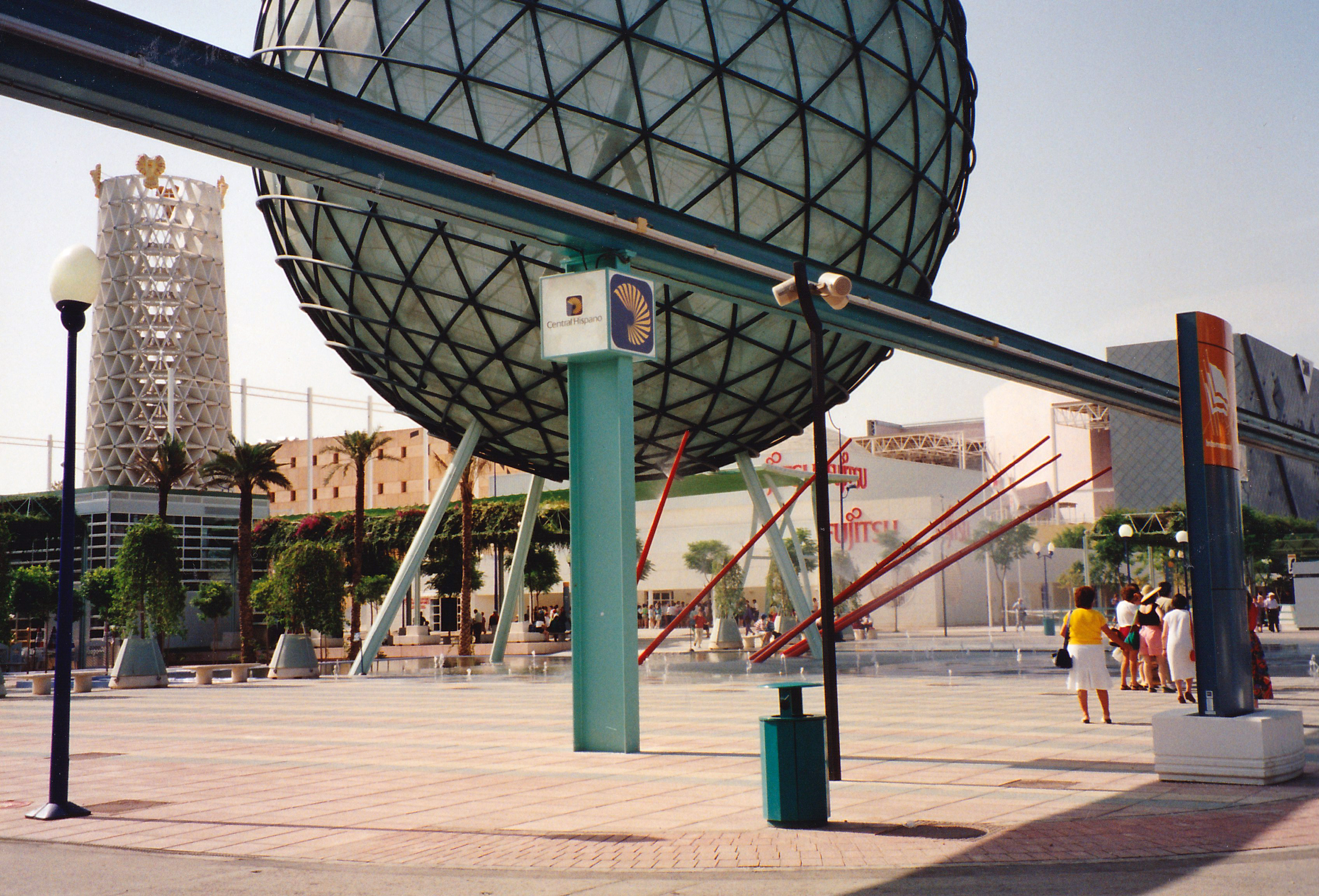
The Bioclimatic Sphere sprayed mist

The hot Sevillian summer was largely abated by a microfilter water air conditioning system throughout the site, principally along the main avenues and streets, under canopied sections both of tensile fabric and greenery. Visitors were sprayed with cool mist in various locations, and could make use of the numerous fountains and wading pools to cool off.

The main element of this cooling system was the Bioclimatic Sphere, which sprayed mist to cool visitors and became one of the most recognizable icons of the expo.

== Post-expo, the expo site today ==
At the end of the Universal Exhibition, many pavilions were dismantled or demolished, others were moved to other locations, and others have been maintained and are part of the Cartuja Science and Technology Park (PCT Cartuja). Administrative services and city facilities have also moved to some of the buildings and plots left by the fair. One can walk throughout the site freely, seeing the pavilions and structures that are still standing.

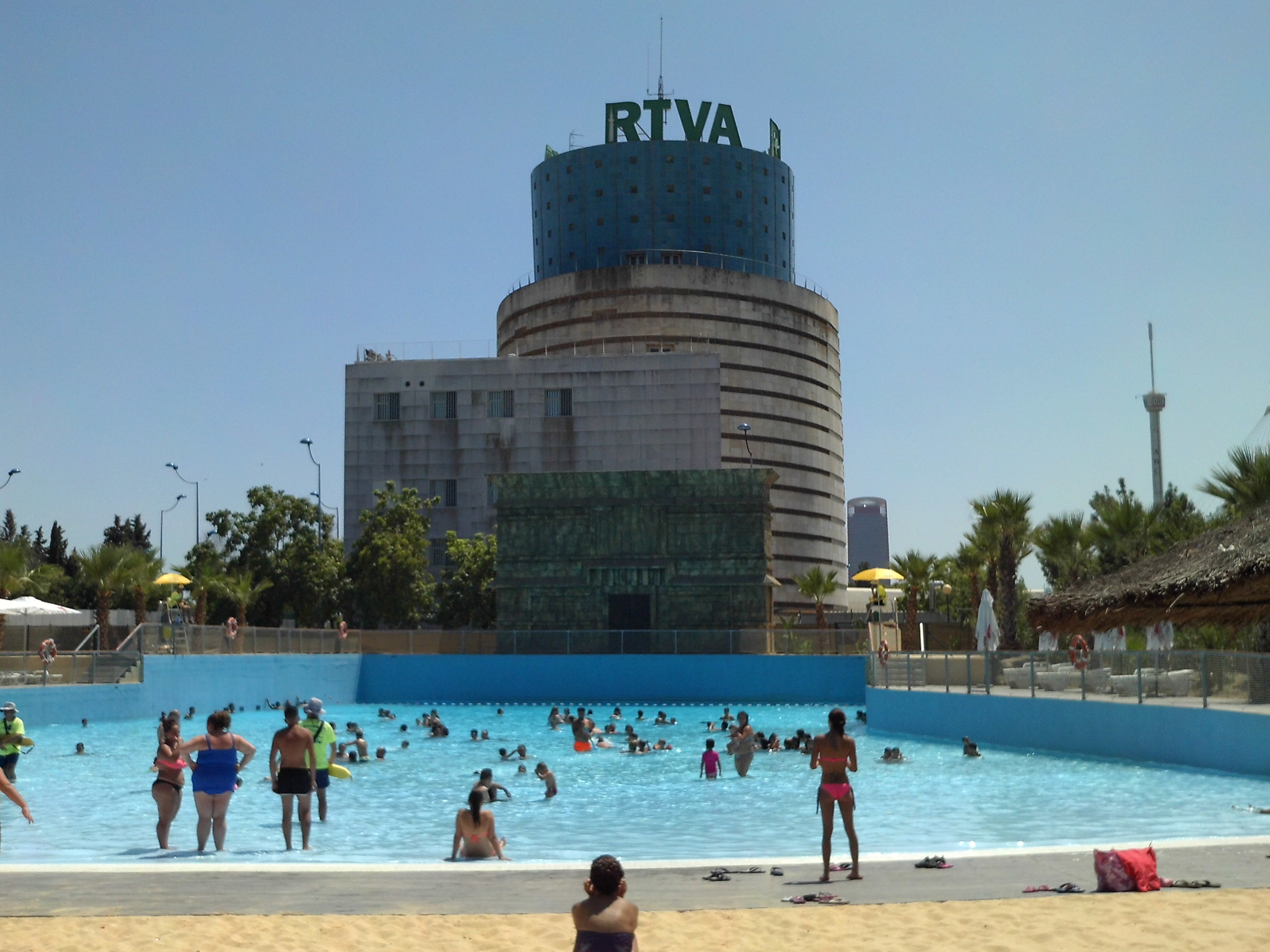
A wave pool in Agua Mágica (in 2015) with the Pavilion of Andalusia in the background.

A theme park named Isla Mágica and a water park named Agua Mágica was built in and around Lake of Spain. Initially called Cartuja, El parque de los descubrimientos, the theme park was built on the grounds of the Lake of Spain, and it also used the Pavilion of Spain and some regional pavilions for attractions. The theme park was later redesigned and it reopened as Isla Mágica on 28 June 1997. In 1998, all the regional pavilions still standing, with the exception of the Pavilion of Andalusia, were demolished and the theme park was extended onto the vacated land. On 28 June 2014, the Agua Mágica water park was opened. Admission to the fun parks requires an entrance fee.
