= Cartuja 93 =

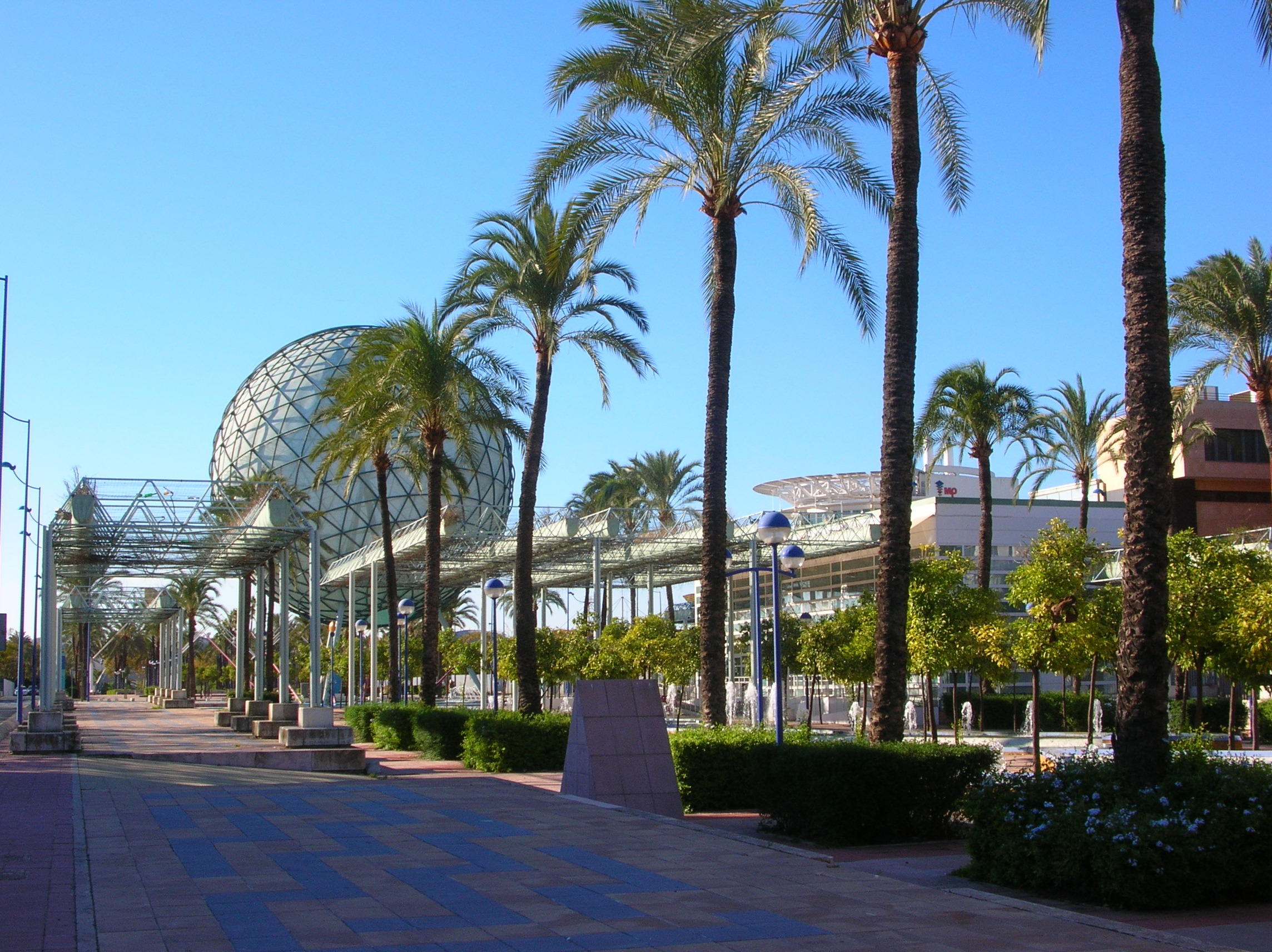
Bioclimatic sphere of the Seville Expo '92.

The Cartuja 93 park is a technological and scientific complex located in Seville, in the Isla de la Cartuja, next to the Monastery of Santa Maria de las Cuevas. It started in 1993 to exploit the showground and buildings inherited from the 1992 Universal Exposition Seville Expo '92.

Cartuja 93 integrates five different development fields: Advanced Technology Enterprises, Public Services of R&D, Scientific Research Centers, Technology Centers, and technical, business and University colleges.

Nowadays, Cartuja´93 is one of the most important technological and scientific parks of south Europe: during 2009 it invoiced 2,194 millions of euros, and employed 14,380 people.

== Representative entities and enterprises ==
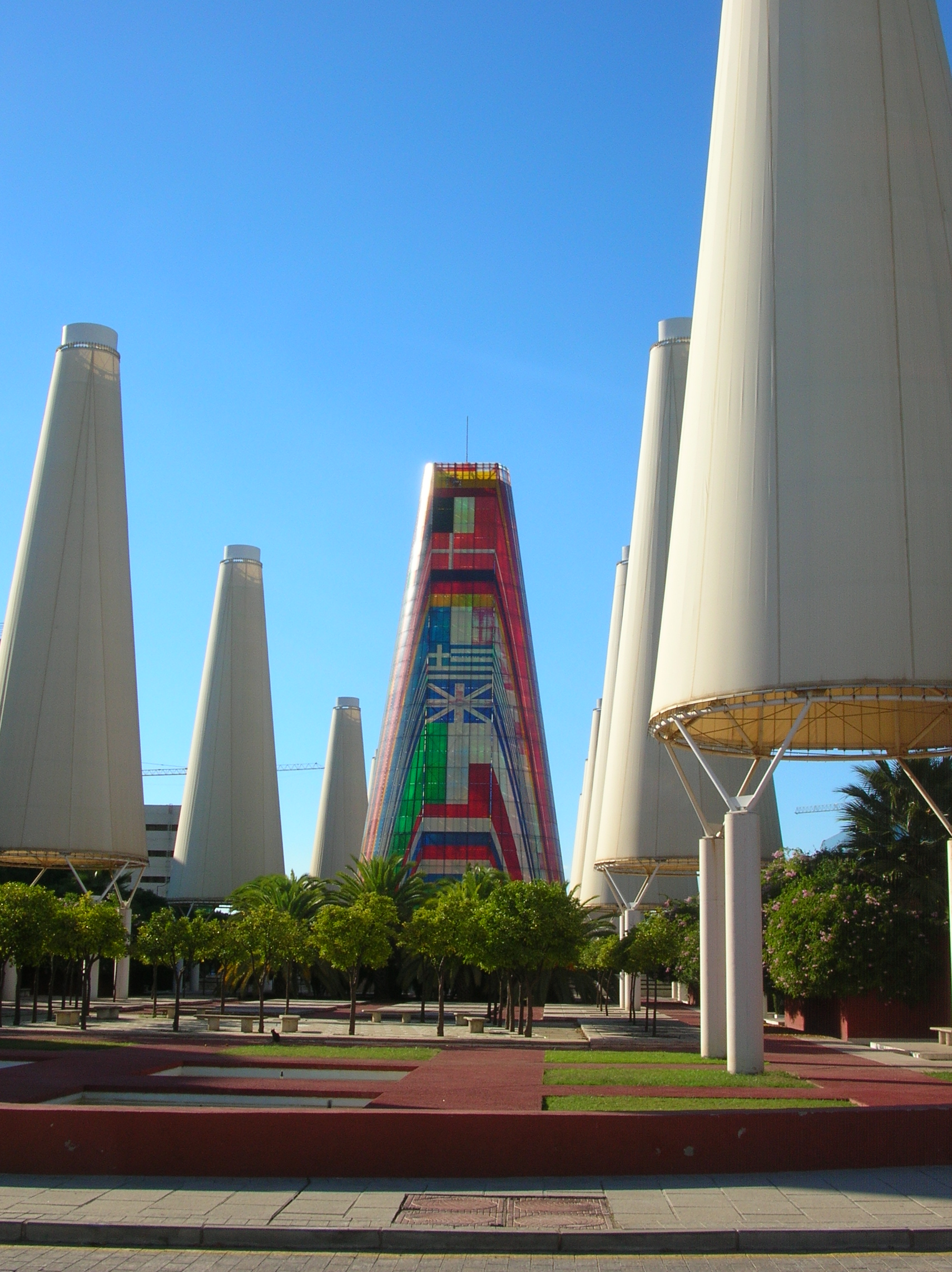
Former Europe's pavilion, today headquarters of the technological and scientific park.

- SHS Consultores
- MP Corporación
- Inerco
- Grupo Tecnológica
- Sadiel
- Sodean
- Isotrol
- Ayesa
- Detea
- IAT
- Egmasa

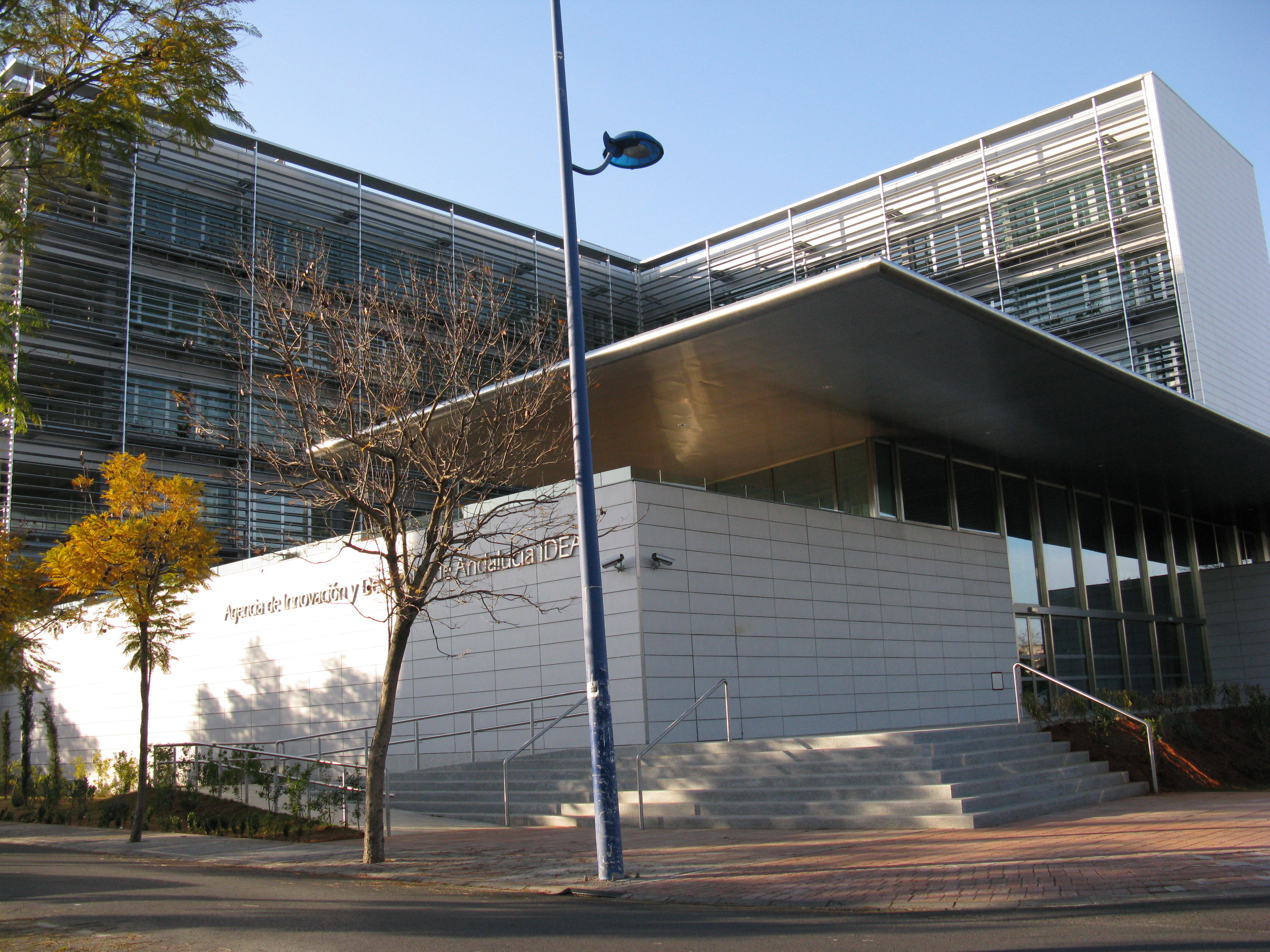
IDEA building.

== Research centers and institutions ==
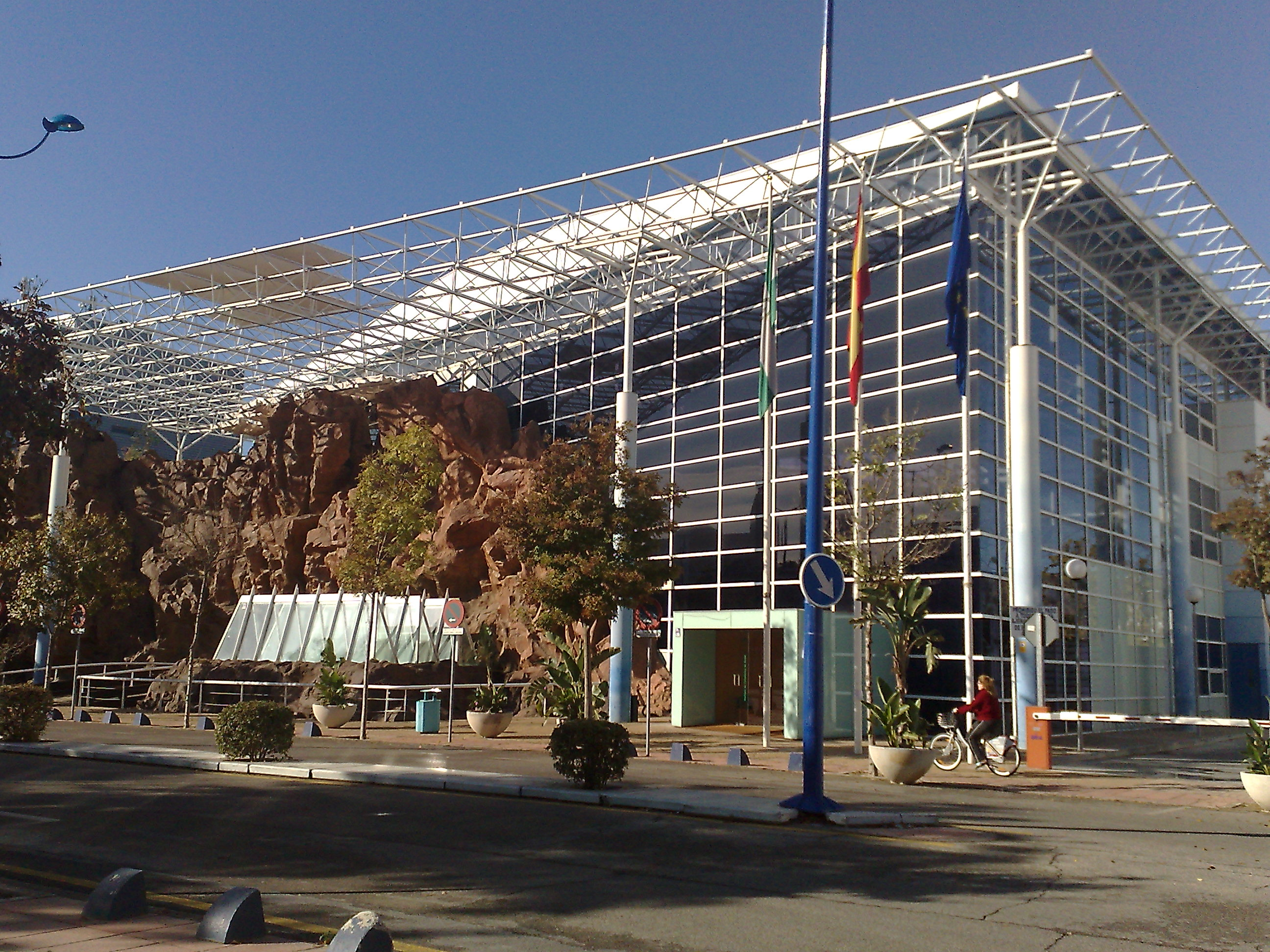
IEA, in the former Pavilion of New Zealand.

- Centro de Investigaciones Científicas Isla de la Cartuja cicCartuja
- Estación Biológica de Doñana (Doñana Biological Station).
- Centro Andaluz de Biología Molecular y Medicina Regenerativa (Andalusian Center of Molecular Biology and Regenerative Medicine).
- Centro Nacional de Aceleradores.
- Instituto de Prospectiva Tecnológica de la UE.
- Centro de Tecnologías del Agua.
- Fundación Progreso y Salud.
- Instituto de Microelectrónica de Sevilla

== Schools ==
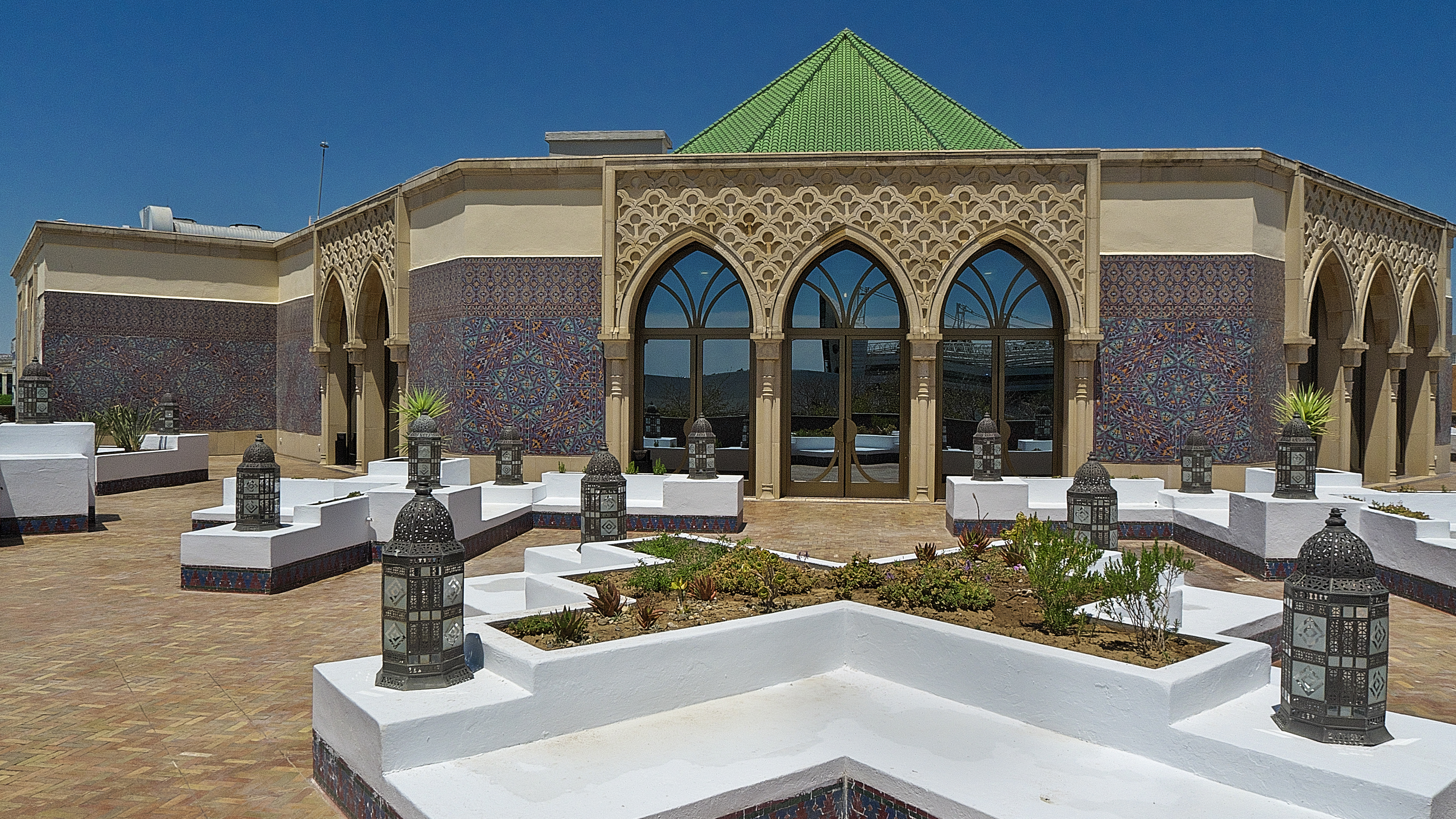
Three Cultures Foundation in the former Pavilion of Morocco.

- Escuela Técnica Superior de Ingenieros de la Universidad de Sevilla (High School of Engineering of Seville). (Ingenierías Industriales, Química, Aeronáutica y Telecomunicaciones)
- Facultad de Comunicación de la Universidad de Sevilla (Communication Sciences Faculty)
- Universidad Internacional de Andalucía (International University of Andalusia)
- Escuela de Organización Industrial de Andalucía.
- ESIC
- CEADE.
- Universitat Oberta de Catalunya

== Others ==
- Confederación de Empresarios de Andalucía CEA
