= Centenario Bridge =

Bridge in Spain

Centenario Bridge Puente del Centenario
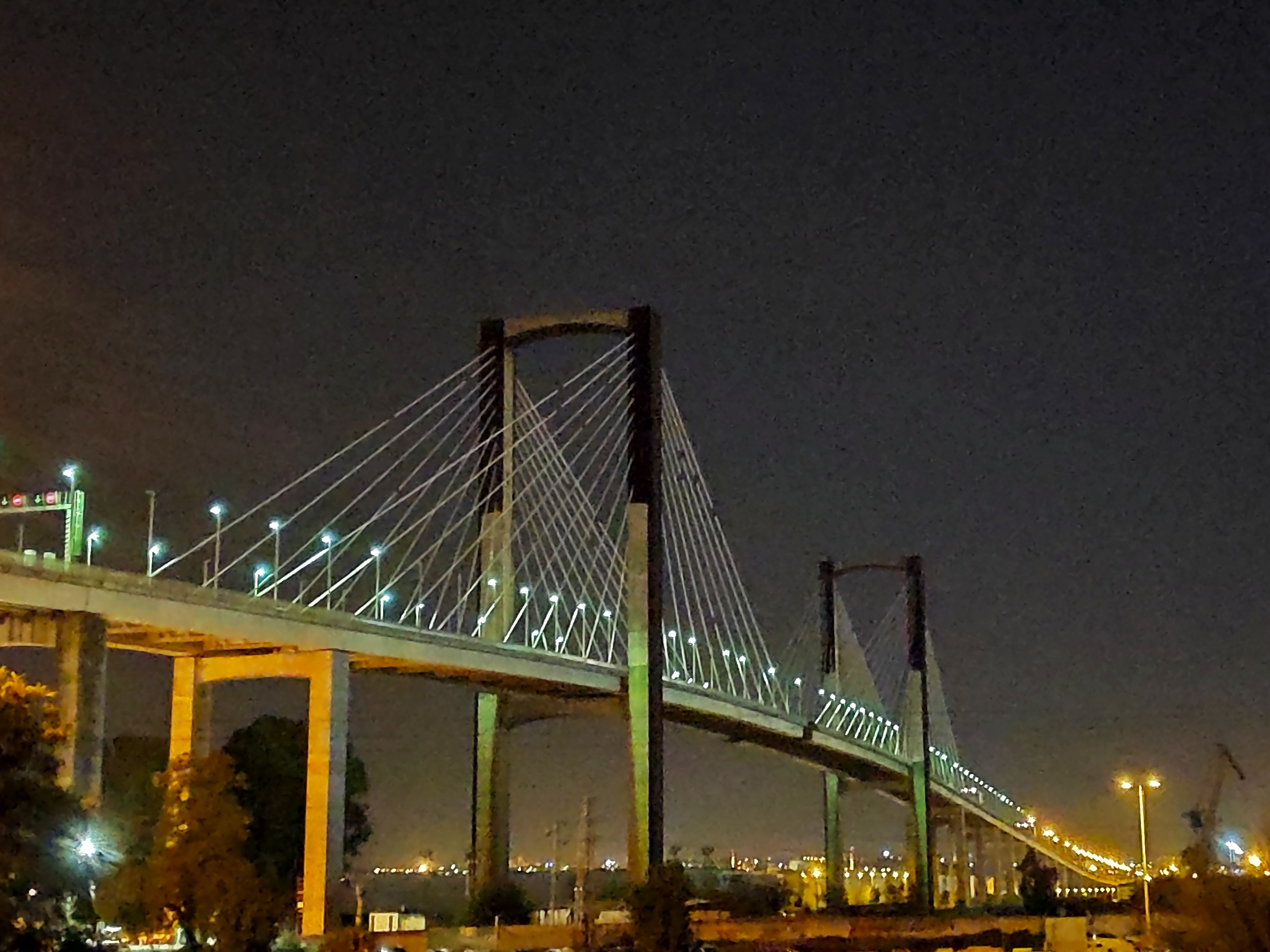
- Coordinates: 37°20′57″N 5°59′35″W
- Crosses: Guadalquivir
- Locale: Seville, Spain

Characteristics
- Design: Cable-stayed bridge
- Total length: 565 m
- Height: 102 m
- Longest span: 265 m

History
- Opened: 15 November 1991

Location
- Interactive map of Centenario Bridge

The Centenario Bridge (Spanish: Puente del Centenario) is a cable-stayed bridge in Seville, Spain. It crosses over the left branch of Guadalquivir.

== History and description ==
Programmed as part of the infrastructures for the Expo '92, building works took place from 1989 to 1991. Part of the SE-30 ring-road, it displays a total length of 565 metres (1,854 ft), with a main span of 265 metres (869 ft) and a maximum height of 102 metres (335 ft). It crosses the river near the Batán harbour of the Port of Seville. The 5 spans are as follows: (48 – 102 – 265 – 102 – 48) m. The bridge has 88 strap cables.

The bridge opened on 15 November 1991. Only featuring 2 lanes of motor vehicles on each side, it soon became a bottleneck.

In July 2018, the Ministry of Public Works presented a project to expand the bridge to 6 lanes (3 lanes on each side). On September 1, 2020, the government opened the bidding for the replacement of the cables, which were at the end of their service life, and the expansion to 6 lanes. It is expected that after several years of delay, the works will be completed in 2025.
