= Instituto de Estadística y Cartografía de Andalucía =

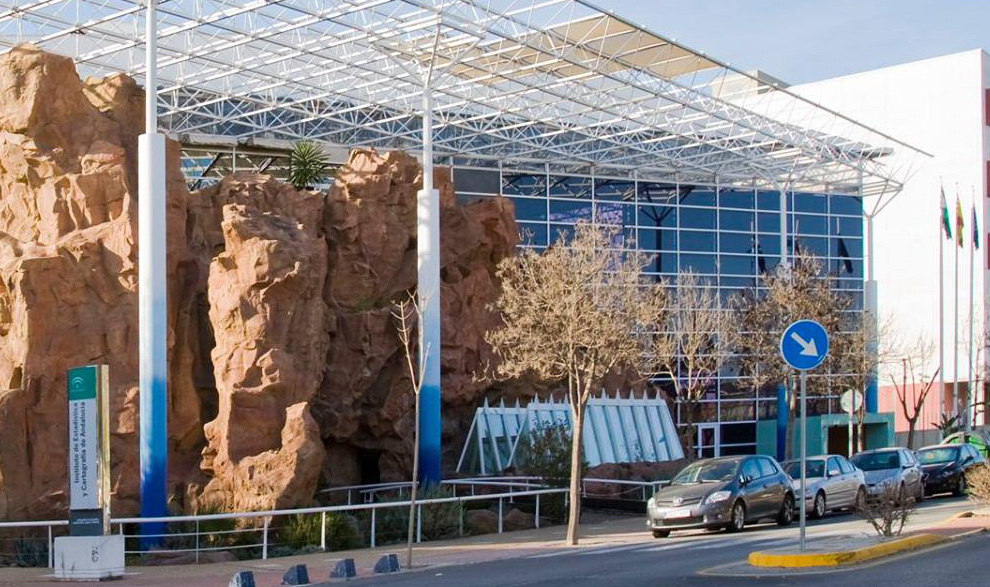

Agency overview
- Formed: 1989
- Headquarters: Pabellón de Nueva Zelanda, Isla de la Cartuja
- Website: Official website

Instituto de Estadística y Cartografía de Andalucía (IECA) is a public organization which coordinates and announces statistics and cartography in Andalucía. In 2019 it was named Elena Manzanera Díaz as the directress.
