= Puente de la Barqueta =

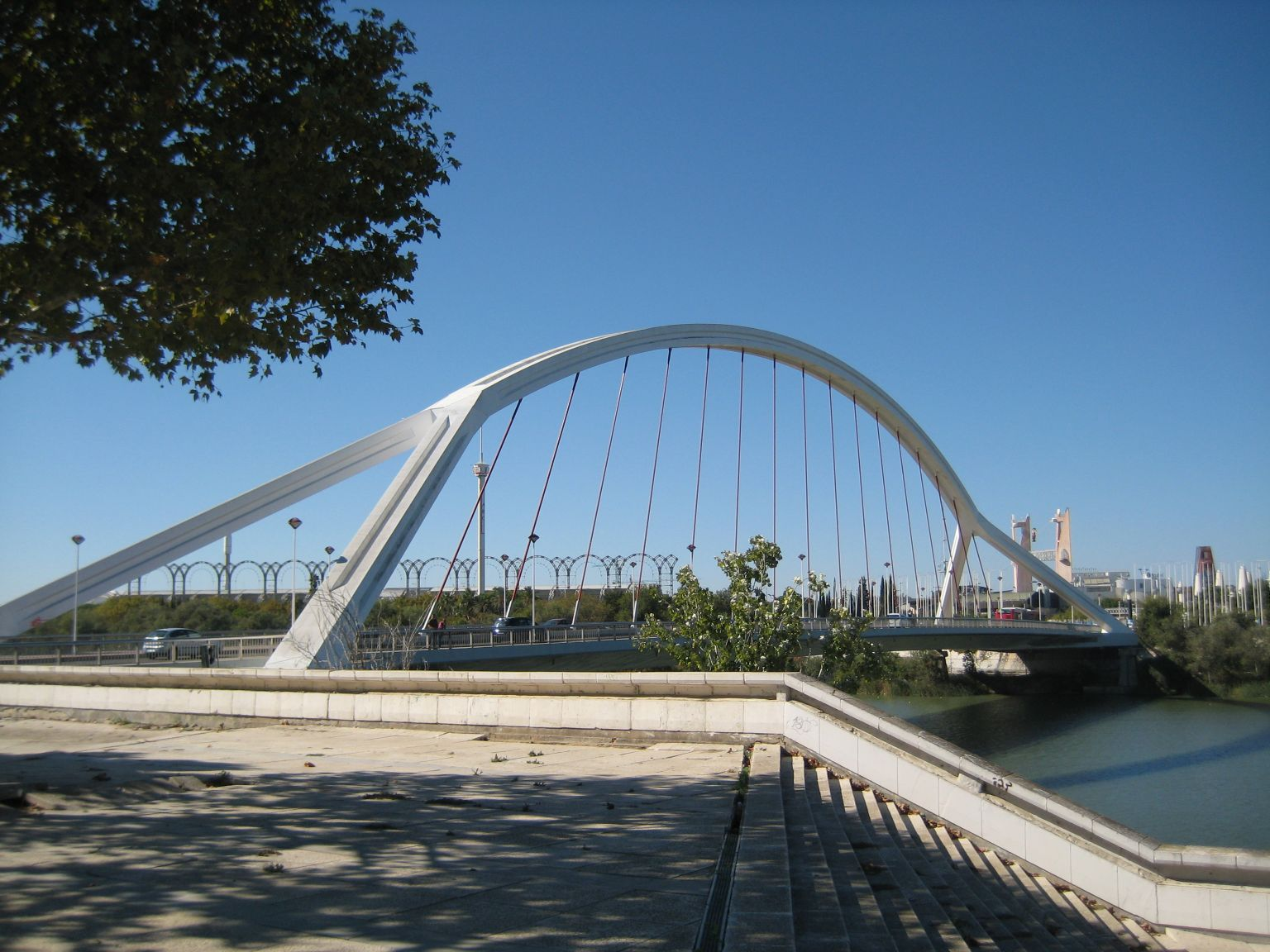
- The Puente de la Barqueta, viewed from the left side of the Guadalquivir river
- Coordinates: 37°24′16″N 5°59′50″W
- Carries: Motor vehicles, pedestrians, and bicycles
- Crosses: Guadalquivir river
- Locale: Seville (Andalusia–Spain)
- Official name: Puente Mapfre
- Preceded by: Puente del Alamillo
- Followed by: Pasarela de la Cartuja

Characteristics
- Total length: 214 m.
- Width: 21,4 m.

History
- Designer: Juan J. Arenas & Marcos J. Pantalerón
- Construction start: 1989
- Construction end: 1992

The Puente de la Barqueta (literally "bridge of the barges", in reference to the formerly present "Barqueta Gate"), officially named Puente Mapfre, is a bridge in the city of Seville (Andalusia, Spain), which spans the Alfonso XIII channel of the Guadalquivir river. It constituted one of the main means of access to the Isla de la Cartuja ("Cartuja island").

It was built between 1989 and 1992, on the occasion of the Universal Exposition Expo'92, and conceived as the main gate for this.
