= Isla de La Cartuja =

Island in the Guadalquivir River in Seville, Spain

Coordinates: 37°23′55″N 6°00′26″W

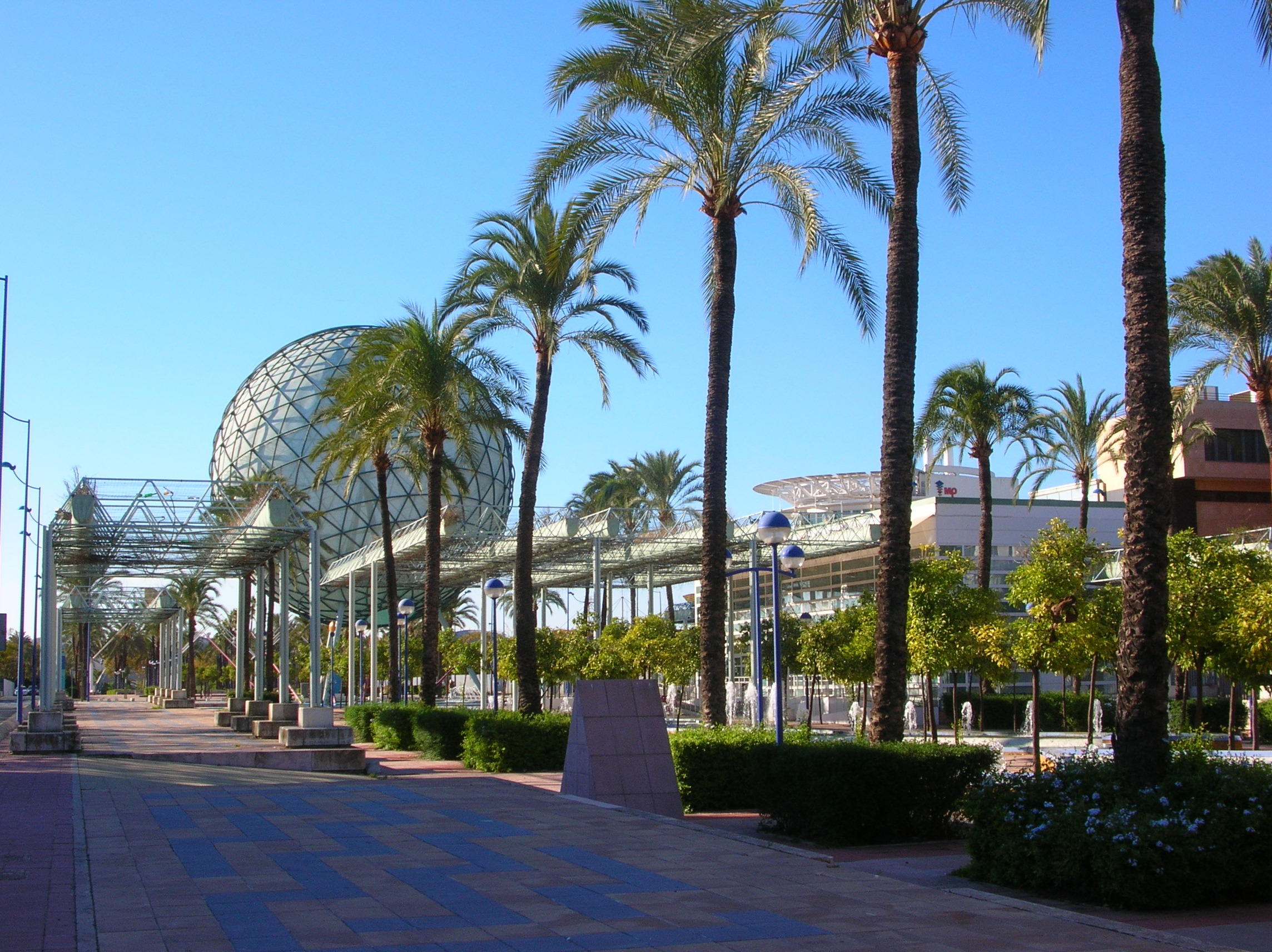
Bioclimatic sphere of the Expo '92.

Isla de la Cartuja (Spanish pronunciation: [ˈis.la ðe la kaɾˈtu.xa]; lit. 'Island of the Carthusians') is an island in the Guadalquivir River at Seville, Spain.

The island's name derives from the cloistered monastery (Cartuja) located on the site, the Monasterio de Santa María de las Cuevas, where Cristopher Columbus lived when planning the voyage to the west. The world's fair to celebrate the 500th anniversary of the first Columbian expeditions, the Expo '92 was located here. Before 1992, the island was completely isolated between two Guadalquivir river branches. After the rearrangement of the river channel system on the occasion of Expo '92, it was joined to mainland by a wide isthmus in the South with Triana neighbourhood, becoming a peninsula.

The former island is connected by notable bridges, such as the Calatrava designed Puente del Alamillo and the Puente de la Barqueta. Among other infrastructures and buildings located on the Isla de la Cartuja, the most important is Cartuja 93 park, a research and development complex, employing 15,000 persons. The La Cartuja Stadium, University Schools of Engineering and Communications, the musealized Pavilion of Navigation, the Centro Andaluz de Arte Contemporáneo (Andalusian Contemporary Art Center) and the Jardín Americano (American Garden, a public botanic garden) are also located here. Additionally, La Cartuja houses several discothèques, and a number of concert halls and theaters, including the Rocío Jurado auditorium, and the Central Theatre, as well as the amusement park Isla Mágica.

Museums in the area include The Centro Andaluz de Arte Contemporáneo (CAAC) in the former Monastery of Santa Maria de las Cuevas also known as the Monastery of the Cartuja.

The neighbourhood and city district has been the focus of urbanization plans for at least a decade. New residential areas and commercial zones have been developed in the neighborhood, and major plans, such as the skyscraper Cajasol Tower, now known as the Sevilla Tower and completed in 2016.

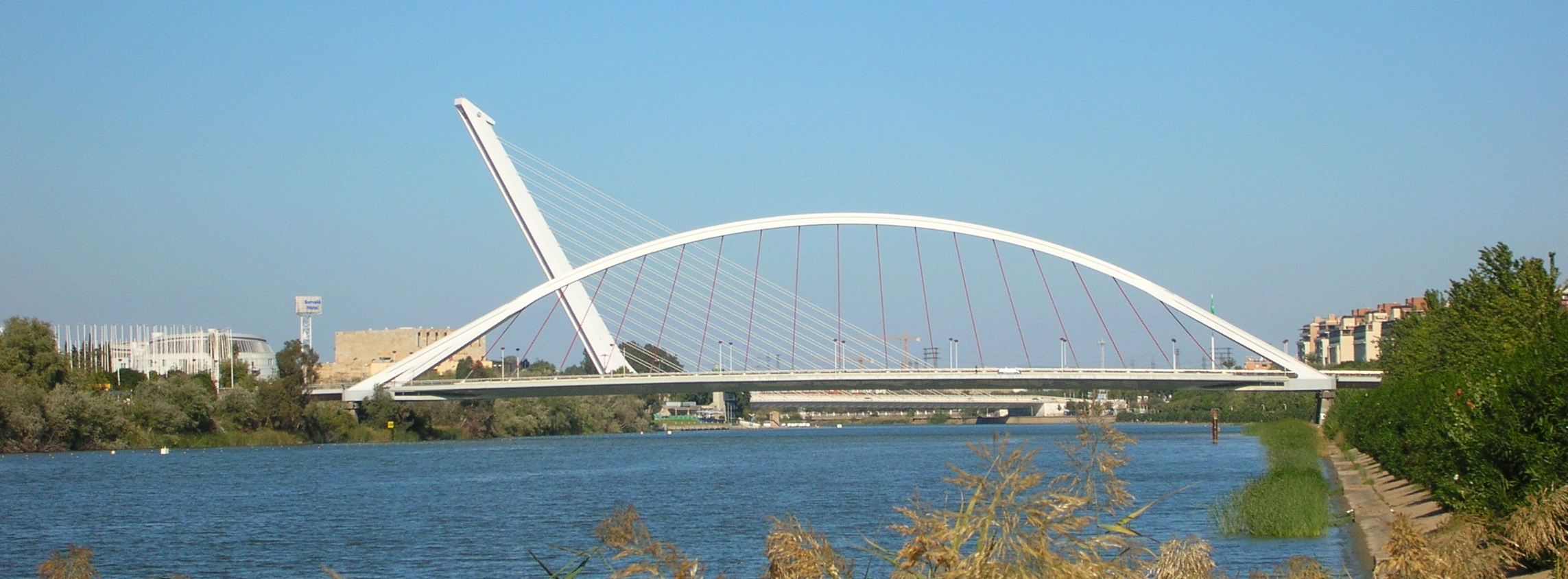
Barqueta Bridge and Calatrava's Alamillo Bridge in the background.
