= GEXcel International Collegium for Advanced Transdisciplinary Gender Studies =

Swedish gender studies organisation

The GEXcel International Collegium for Advanced Transdisciplinary Gender Studies is an inter-university centre of excellence in gender studies based in Sweden, which "aims to develop transnational, intersectional and transformative gender research, and to become a meeting place for different generations of excellent gender scholars." It is hosted by the Center for Feminist Social Studies at Örebro University, Linköping University and Karlstad University.

It was established in 2012, as the permanent continuation of the Centre of Gender Excellence (GEXcel), that was established by the Swedish Research Council at Örebro University and Linköping University in 2006, and that existed until the end of 2013. Its stated aim was to evolve into a more permanent European centre of excellence "dedicated to advanced, transnational and transdisciplinary gender research." Its affiliates include many internationally leading researchers in the field of gender studies.

GEXcel and Routledge are responsible for the book series Routledge Advances in Feminist Studies and Intersectionality, which began publication in 2010.

Its research activities were ranked as "very good to outstanding" by the Swedish Research Council in a 2011 evaluation.

== Notable academics ==
- Ursula Apitzsch
- Margunn Bjørnholt
- Valerie Bryson
- Cynthia Cockburn
- Ann Ferguson
- Anita Göransson
- Jeff Hearn
- Liisa Husu
- Stevi Jackson
- Sheila Jeffreys
- Anna G. Jónasdóttir
- Kathleen B. Jones
- Michael Kimmel
- Nina Lykke
- Kathleen Lynch
- Louise Morley
- Robert Morrell
- Teresa Rees
- Gloria Wekker
