= Forte (surname) =

Forte is a surname of Italian origin. Notable people with the surname include:

- Adrian Forte, Jamaican-Canadian celebrity chef
- Aldo Forte (1918–2007), American football player
- Aldo Rafael Forte (born 1953), Cuban-American composer
- Allen Forte (1926–2014), American music theorist and musicologist
- Anthony Forté or Rappin' 4-Tay (born 1968), American rapper
- Antonio Forte (1928–2006), Italian bishop
- Berry Forte (born 1937), American politician
- Bob Forte (1922–1996), American football player
- Bruno Forte (born 1949), Italian theologian and ecclesiastic
- Carla Forte (born 1994), Brazilian former tennis player
- Charles Forte, Baron Forte (1908–2007), Scottish hotelier
- Chet Forte (1935–1996), American television director, sports radio talk show host, and college basketball player
- Christina Forte (born 1967), Brazilian windsurfer
- Daniele Forte (born 1990), Italian footballer
- Deborah Forte, American television producer
- Dieter Forte (1935–2019), German author and playwright
- Dillon Forte (born 1987), American tattoo artist and entrepreneur
- Duilio Forte (born 1967), Swedish-Italian artist and architect
- Fabian Forte (born 1943), American singer and actor
- Francesco Forte (disambiguation), various people
- Iaia Forte (born 1962), Italian actress
- Iván Forte (born 1998), Spanish footballer
- Jason Forte (born 1982), American basketball player
- Joe Forte (born 1990), American public servant
- Joelle Forte (born 1986), American former figure skater
- John Forte (1918–1966), American comic book artist
- John Forté (1975–2026), American recording artist and producer
- Jonathan Forte (born 1986), English footballer
- Joseph Forte (born 1981), American basketball player
- Joseph S. Forte, American con artist
- Julian Forte (born 1993), Jamaican sprinter
- Kate Forte, American film producer
- Linwood Forte (born 1964), American serial killer
- Luca Forte (c. 1615–c. 1670), Italian painter
- Luca Forte (footballer) (born 1994), Italian footballer
- Madeleine Forte (born 1938), American classical pianist, wife of Allen Forte
- Marcio Forte (born 1977), Italian futsal player
- Marlene Forte (born 1961), Cuban actress and producer
- Marlene Malahoo Forte, Jamaican politician
- Matt Forté (born 1985), American football player
- Maura Forte (born 1959), Italian politician
- Miroslav Forte (1911–1942), Slovenian gymnast
- Mo Forte (1947–2021), American football player and coach
- Nana Forte (born 1981), Slovenian composer
- Nick Apollo Forte (1938–2020), American musician and actor
- Osvaldo Forte (1919–2005), Argentine weightlifter
- Ottavio Forte, American physicist and professor
- Renée Forte (born 1987), Brazilian mixed martial artist
- Rocco Forte (born 1945), son of Charles Forte, Baron Forte who inherited the hotel business
- Reggie Forte (1949–1997), founding member of the Black Panther Party
- Riccardo Forte (born 1999), Italian footballer
- Simone Forte (born 1996), Italian triple jumper
- Stormie Forte, American lawyer, radio host, and politician
- Ulrich Forte (born 1974), Italian football coach and former footballer
- Will Forte (born 1970), Saturday Night Live comedian
