= Center for Feminist Social Studies =

The Center for Feminist Social Studies (CFS) is a research centre at Örebro University in Sweden with a thematic focus on "gender, society and change," and one of Sweden's leading gender studies research institutions. It co-hosts the GEXcel International Collegium for Advanced Transdisciplinary Gender Studies, originally established as an international centre of excellence in gender studies based at Örebro and Linköping by the Swedish Research Council in 2006.

== Academics ==
- Anna G. Jónasdóttir
- Liisa Husu
- Jeff Hearn
- Maria Jansson
