= Lundahl =

Lundahl is a Swedish ornamental surname composed of the elements lund ('grove') and dahl, an ornamental spelling of dal ('valley'). Notable people with the surname include:

- Amélie Lundahl (1850–1914), Finnish painter
- Arthur C. Lundahl (1915–1992), American intelligence officer
- Christian Lundahl (born 1972), Swedish academic
- Eskil Lundahl (1905–1992), Swedish swimmer
- Harry Lundahl (1905–1988), Swedish footballer and manager
- Karoliina Lundahl (born 1968), Finnish weightlifter
- Mats Lundahl (born 1946), Swedish economist

== See also ==
- Lundal
