= Sadeghian =

Sadeghian is a surname. Notable people with the surname include:

- Ali Sadeghian, Iranian-Swedish musician and actor
- Andre Sadeghian (born 1984), Canadian football player
- Armina Sadeghian (born 2002), Iranian sport shooter
- Payam Sadeghian (born 1992), Iranian football player
