= Duilio Forte =

Italian artist and architect (born 1967)

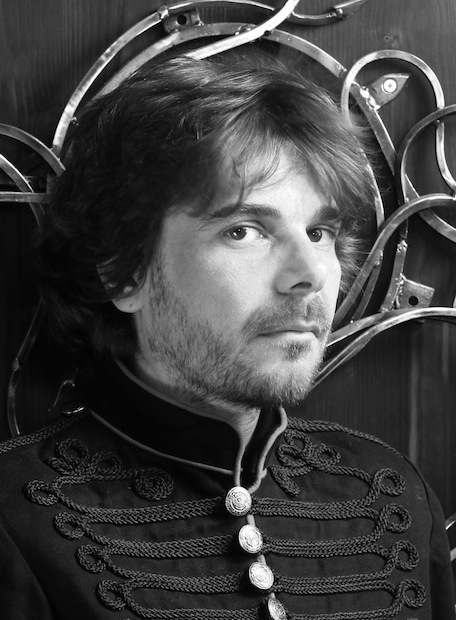
- Forte in 2010
- Born: 5 November 1967 (age 58); Milan, Italy
- Education: Polytechnic University of Milan
- Website: www.atelierforte.com

Duilio Forte (born 5 November 1967) is a Swedish-Italian artist and architect. He works primarily with wood and iron, creating large sculptures and unique exterior sculptural saunas. He teaches at the Nuova Accademia Belle Arti di Milano and other institutions in Italy.

== Early life ==
Forte was born in Milan in 1967 and is half Italian, and half Swedish. His Italian father, Ettore Forte, was a surgeon and his Swedish mother was a housewife.

He studied architecture at Polytechnic University of Milan, graduating in 1994. In 1994, he won the first prize in the San Carlo Borromeo at La Permanente of Milan with the Ekeberg Sauna, constructed in Sweden.

== Career ==
After college, Forte continued designing and building outdoor saunas, with each being a unique architectural design. On March 13, 1998, Forte founded AtelierFORTE, an architecture and sculpture research laboratory. AtelierFORTE specializes in unique outdoor saunas and other architectural installations. Its structures are designed according to Forte's ArkiZoic Manifesto, written in 2009 on the anniversary of the birth of Charles Darwin. The manifesto defines his style which is characterized by a union of architecture and the geologic periods. It includes eight points: method, evolution, mathematics, representation, structure, symmetry, materials, and decoration.

Since 2003, Forte has organized and taught StugaProject, an annual art and architecture workshop near the town of Grythyttan in Sweden. He also teaches materials technologies at Nuova Accademia Belle Arti di Milano in Milan, Italy.

In 2008, Forte participated in the 11th International Architecture Exhibition of Venice, creating the installation Sleipnir Venexia. In 2010, he was again invited to participate in the International Architecture Exhibition of Venice and created the installation Sleipnir Convivalis. His Sleipnir series is inspired by the legend of Trojan horse and the Norse myth of Odin's eight-legged horse; it features sculptures that are up to 60 feet (18 m) tall. Forte also participated in the XXI Triennale International Exhibition of Milan in 2016 with his zoomorphic work URSUS.

Curator Beppe Finessi described Forte's process: "His whole life is a workshop. He is the veritable 'Craftsman' of the Italian architecture, both designer and builder. He doesn't need to talk to the workers or constantly see what they are doing. He does everything himself. His pencil is a saw, his AutoCAD is a welder. He makes everything he needs with his own hands, partly because it would be very difficult to explain to anyone else what's going on inside his complicated, visionary, fantastic head."

Forte became a member of the Swedish Association of Architects in 2005 and was nominated for the Yakov Chernikhov International Prize for young architects in 2010.

== Personal life ==
Forte lives in Milan a former textile factory that he purchased in 1998. The 5,400 square feet (500 m^{2}) building is more than 100 years old. His brother, Lucio, is an artist who lives in an adjacent factory building.

== Exhibitions ==
- 2007 – Hugin e Munin, exhibition, Milan, Italy
- 2008 – Sleipnir BASTU opera, exhibition, AtelierFORTE, Milan, Italy
- 2008 – Yggdrasill Steneby opera, exhibition, Dåls Långed, Sweden
- 2009 – Encelado, exhibition, Gran Salone dei Planisferi, Milan, Italy
- 2009 – Arkizoic OBSESSIO, exhibition, Fortezza da Basso, Florence, Italy
- 2009 December – Sideropithecus Fortis, Affetti da cretinismo – Celebrating Cesare Lombroso exhibition, Milan, Italy
- 2010 April – Ars Combinatoria – exhibition, SpazioRT, Milan, Italy
- 2010 April – OSPITI INASPETTATI. Case di ieri, design di oggi, exhibition at Casa Boschi di Stefano, Milan, Italy
- 2010 May – WOOD 2010, exhibition at Virserum Art Museum
- 2010 July – Sleipnir Albus exhibition at Galleria Il Frantoio, Capalbio, Tuscany, Italy
- 2010 August – Sleipnir Convivalis Quintus, exhibition AILATI, Biennale di Venezia, Venice, Italy
- 2010 September – Fafnir, exhibition IL TESORO DI BOMISA, Triennale di Milano, Milan, Italy
- 2013 – The Centuries Long Detail – Collective exhibit, Cheongju International Craft Biennale, South Korea
- 2013 – Semi-Equi – double solo exhibit, GAM Galleria d'arte moderna Genova Nervi, Genoa, Italy
- 2014 – Sleipnir XXXIII – temporary installation, Triennale di Milano exhibition, Milan, Italy
- 2016 – URSUS – temporary installation – XXI Triennale, Triennale di Milano exhibition, Milan, Italy
- 2019 – ArkiZoic Project III 55249 – solo exhibition, Francesco Zanuso Gallery, Milan, Italy
- 2022 – ArkiZoic Project XI 66301 – solo exhibition, iKonica Art Gallery, Milan, Italy

== Works ==
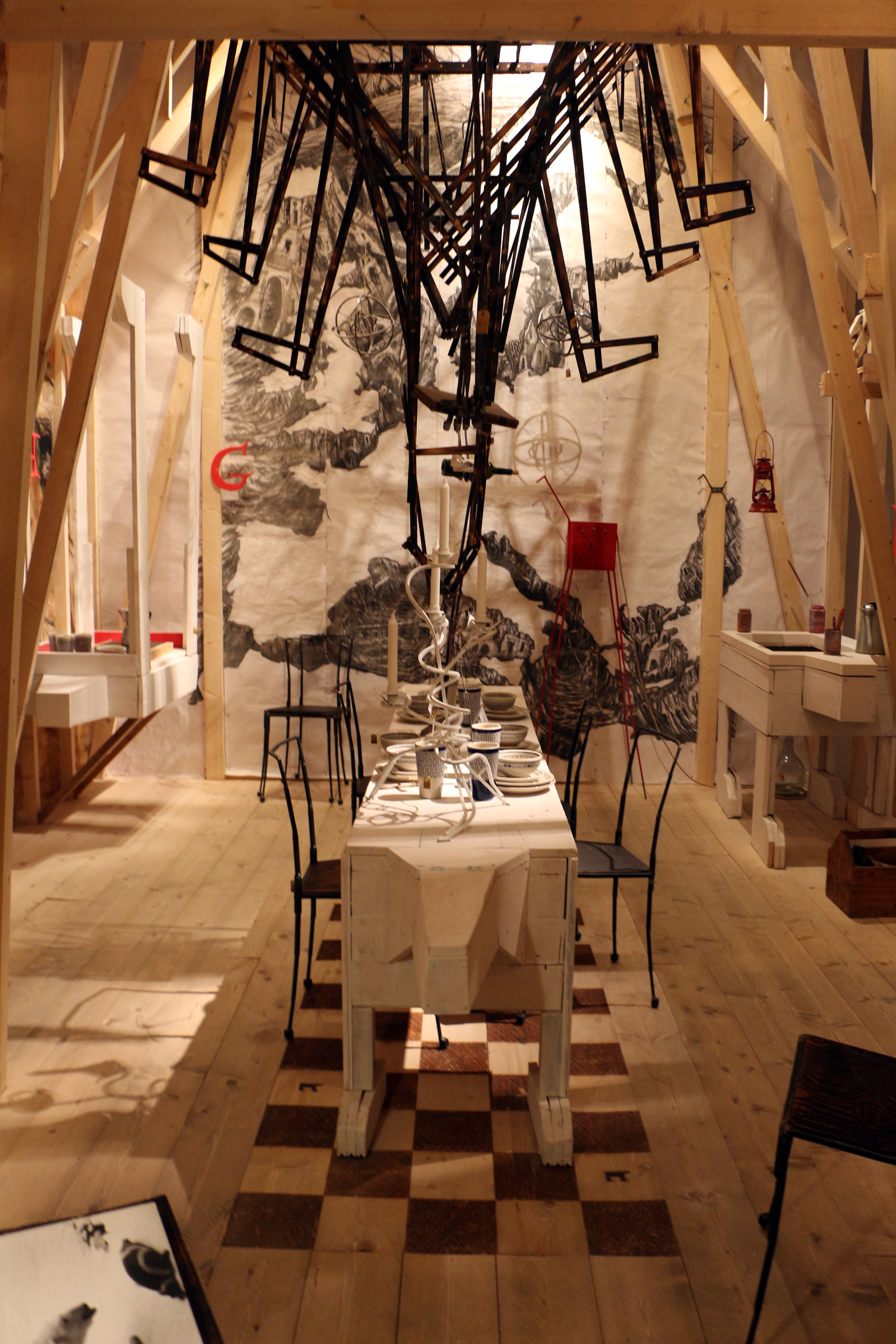
Duilio forte, progetto ursus, 2016, 01

- 1994 – Ekeberg sauna, Sweden
- 2006 – Spiv, opera – StugaProject2006, Grythyttan, Sweden
- 2006 – Taenaris, opera – Milan, Italy
- 2007 – Spiken, opera – StugaProject2007, Grythyttan, Sweden
- 2008 – Sleipnir TAVRINORVM opera – arsenale Cavalli, Turin, Italy
- 2008 – Sleipnir VENEXIA, XI – Biennale di architettura, Venice, Italy
- 2008 – JulBock NABA, opera, Nuova Accademia di Belle Arti, Milan, Italy
- 2008 – Sleipnir Spiken
- 2009 – Fenrir, opera – Milan, Italy
- 2009 February – Foundation of ArkiZoic, Milan, Italy
- 2009 – Pliosaurus, Milan, Italy
- 2009 – Sleipnir Nuncius – Vittoriale degli Italiani, Gardone Riviera, Italy
- 2009 September – Drakkar Yggdrasill – Grythyttan, Sweden
- 2010 March – Birnam Wood – Piazza Sempione, 616 Fifth Avenue, New York City, New York, U.S.
- 2010 April – Sleipnir Trebuchet – Triennale Bovisa, Milan, Italy
- 2010 August – Sleipnir Ratatoskr – Grythyttan, Sweden
- 2011 January – Sleipnir Biologiska – Biologiska Museet (Biological Museum), Stockholm, Sweden
- 2011 February – La Foresta di Sleipnir – Rotonda della Besana, Milan, Italy
- 2011 April – Mammuthus Belli sculpture sauna
- 2011 September – Sleipnir Ex Silva – Polytechnic University of Milan, Milan, Italy
- 2011 November – Phoenix Turris, Turin, Italy
- 2011 – Asgard Turris Venti 829 Sculpture
- 2011 – Asgard Turris sculpture
- 2011 – Phoenix sculpture
- 2012 February – Sleipnir Lambrus – temporary installation, Ventura Lambrate, Milan, Italy
- 2012 March – Huginn&Muninn Sauna– Piacenza, Italy
- 2012 April – Bois de Boulon – Missoni, Milan, Italy
- 2012 April – Lampada Flux III + HugMun II – Misiad Milano si Autoproduce, La Fabbrica del Vapore, Milan, Italy
- 2012 May – Eva-sioni – Mostra, Palazzo Vernazza, Lecce, Apulia, Italy
- 2012 June – Sleipnir Thermarum – Terme del Bacucco, Viterbo, Lazio, Italy
- 2012 August – Sleipnir Automatum – Grythyttan, Sweden
- 2012 November – Huginn, Turin, Italy
- 2013 – Sleipnir Alea – temporary installation, ART.4, Fossano, Italy
- 2013 – Sleipnir Volta – temporary installation, Streetscape2, Como, Italy
- 2013 – Sleipnir Argus Junior – temporary installation, Trepponti di Comacchio, Commacchio, Italy
- 2013 – Sleipnir Bok – Grythyttan, Sweden
- 2013 – Sleipnir Argus – Casa Museo Remo Brindisi, Lido di Spina, Comacchio, Italy
- 2013 – Sleipnir Drusi – Free University of Bozen-Bolzano, Bolzano, South Tyrol, Italy
- 2013 – Sleipnir Steam – Fabbrica del Vapore, Milan, Italy
- 2013 – Castra Exemplorum – temporary installation, Fabbrica del Vapore, Milan, Italy
- 2014 – Sleipnir Meano – Borgo dei Creativi, Meaño, Italy
- 2014 – Sleipnir Tidonis – CArD, Pianello Val Tidone, Italy
- 2014 – Sleipnir Cine – temporary installation at Open, Lido di Venezia, Italy
- 2014 – Sleipnir Spiken II – Grythyttan, Sweden
- 2014 – Sleipnir Park – temporary installation, Giardini Indro Montanelli, Milan, Italy
- 2014 – Harpago Salis – temporary installation, Magazzini del Sale, Venice, Italy
- 2014 – Sleipnir 1861 – temporary installation, Piazza Carignano, Turin, Italy
- 2014 – Sleipnir Lúg – temporary installation, Lugano, Canton Ticino, Switzerland
- 2015 – Turris Pythagorica – Södra Hyttan, Hjulsjo, Hällefors, Sweden
- 2015 – Sleipnir Ciconiae – Stary Bubel, Poland
- 2017 – Sleipnir XLV Ciconiae II 8737 – north side of Chiaravalle Abbey, Milan, Italy
- 2017 – Turris Pithagorica II 14891
- 2017 – Yggdrasill Triennale 13217
- 2017 – Finis Extra Munch 11279
- 2018 – Birnam Wood IV 35677 – Palazzo Sebelloni, Milan, Italy
- 2018 – Sleipnir XLVIII Laterna 27697 – Grythyttan, Sweden
- 2018 – Sleipnir XLII Latemar 2797 – Respirart Sculpture Park, Trentino, Italy
- 2018 – ArkiZoic Project II 7297 – Spazio Giovannoni, Milan, Italy
- 2020 – Finis Extra painting
- 2021 – Dvlightship II
- 2022 – Yggdrasill II Arcimboldi
