= Johan Dennelind =

Swedish businessman

- Born: Johan Eric Dennelind; 1969 (age 56–57)
- Education: Örebro University
- Occupation: Businessman
- Title: Former CEO, du
- Term: September 2019 – September 2020
- Predecessor: Osman Sultan
- Successor: Fahad Al Hassawi

Johan Eric Dennelind (born 1969) is a Swedish businessman, and a former CEO of du, a United Arab Emirates telecom company, from September 2019 to September 2020. He was previously president and CEO of Telia Company, the dominant telephone company and mobile network operator in Sweden and Finland.

== Early life ==
Dennelind was born in 1969. He has a master's degree in Business Administration from the Örebro University, Sweden.

== Career ==
Dennelind started with Telia Company as a management trainee in 1990.

He was the CEO of Teliasonera from 2013 to 2016. He was then president and CEO of Telia Company, the dominant telephone company and mobile network operator in Sweden and Finland until 2019.

In September 2019, he succeeded Osman Sultan as CEO of du, a United Arab Emirates telecom company, and departed the company a year later.

== Personal life ==
Dennelind is married, with children.
