= Grythyttan School of Hospitality, Culinary Arts & Meal Science =

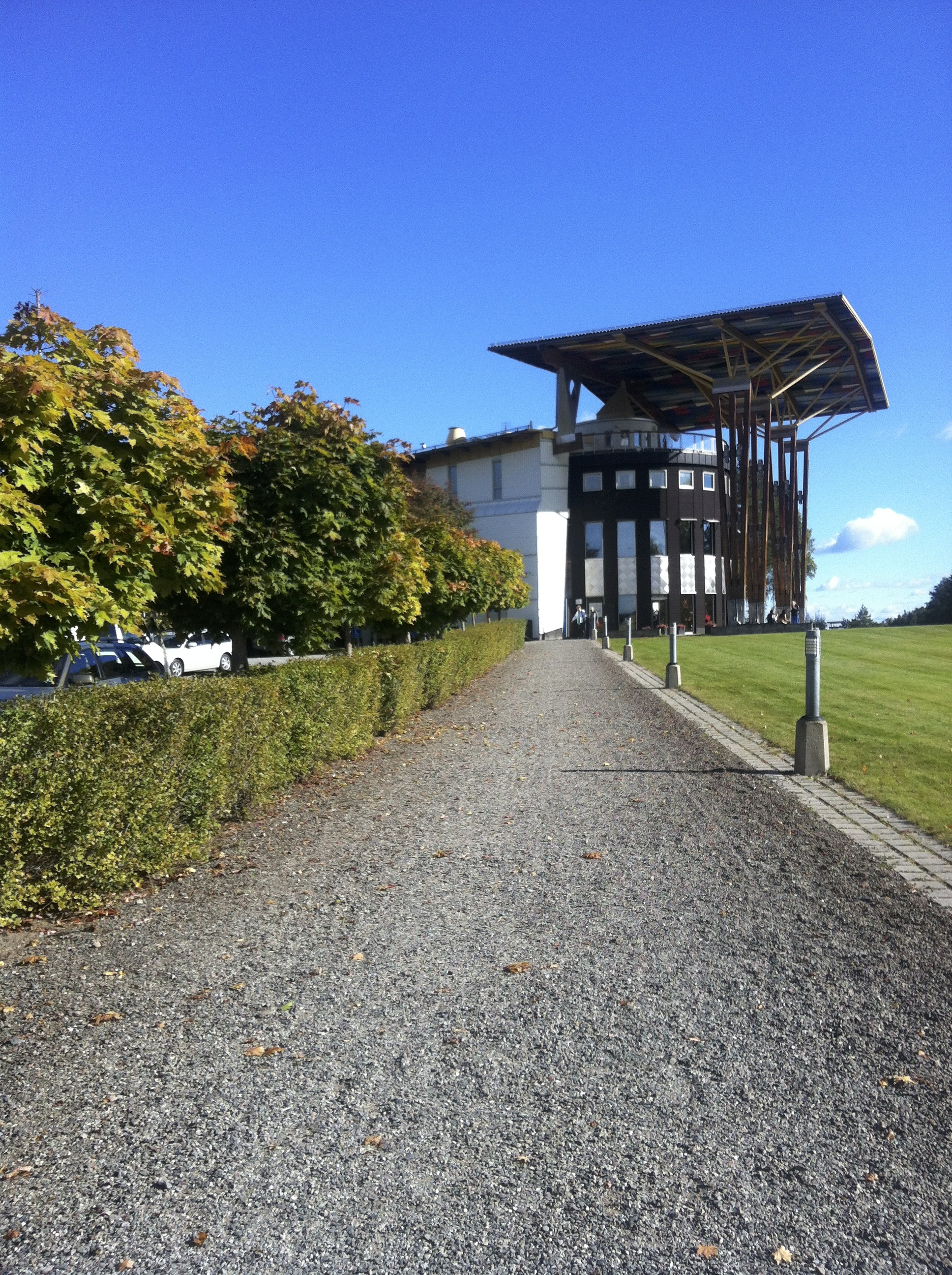
Måltidens Hus

Grythyttan School of Hospitality, Culinary Arts & Meal Science is part of Örebro University and is an important center for Swedish gastronomy. The school is located in Grythyttan, 80 km north of Örebro and one of the main buildings is called Måltidens Hus, which is shown in the picture on the right hand side. The specialty the school offers is an education that combines theoretical knowledge with practical experience with an aesthetic perspective and it is currently offering education in the fields of Culinary Arts, Meal Science and Hospitality. Since 2010, a program with an alignment towards the ecological perspective of the meal, have parts of their education in Grythyttan. The graduating students from the school are seen as the future pioneers of Swedish gastronomy and in the hospitality industry. The students are taught by people from the hotel and restaurant industry, such as Mischa Billing, one of the judges in the reality television show Swedish Master Chef

The subject of Culinary Arts combines science and practical and aesthetic knowledge in research on the meal. The scientific approach is multidisciplinary and collaboration with other disciplines is essential, such as ethnology, sociology, sensory science, education, business, nutrition, food science and domestic science, subjects re-searching the meal from different perspectives. The research questions are rooted in a holistic view on the meal as undergraduate and graduate level based on: room, meeting, product, control system and the atmosphere.

One person who is usually thought of when mentioning the school is Carl-Jan Granqvist. He was the initiator to the education and an important person for the whole village.

The school also features the Cookbook Museum, which includes cooksbooks dating back to the 15th century, menus, pamphlets and other materials.
