= Valerie Bryson =

British political scientist

Valerie Bryson is a British political scientist, who has published extensively on feminist theory and politics. She was appointed professor of politics at the University of Huddersfield in 2002, and is founder of the Centre for Democracy and Governance in 2006, serving as its director until 2008. Since 2010, she has been professor emerita.

Her books include Feminist Debates, which has also been translated into Japanese, and Feminist Political Theory (An Introduction), which has also been translated into Greek and Russian (the latter one by Olga Lipovskaya). She has been a visiting professor at the Centre of Gender Excellence in Örebro since 2007.

== Books ==
- Jonasdottir, A., Bryson, V. and Jones, K. (2010) Sexuality, Gender and Power: Intersectional and Transnational Perspectives . Routledge Advances in Feminist Studies and Intersectionality. : Routledge . ISBN 9780415880879
- Bryson, V (2007) Gender and the politics of time: feminist theory and contemporary debates . Bristol, UK: The Policy Press . ISBN 9781861347497
- Blakeley, G. and Bryson, V. (2007) The impact of feminism on political concepts and debates . London, UK: Manchester University Press . ISBN 9780719075117
- Bryson, V (2003) Feminist political theory: an introduction . Basingstoke: Palgrave Macmillan . ISBN 0333945689
- Blakeley, G. and Bryson, V. (2002) Contemporary political concepts . London, UK: Pluto . ISBN 9780745317960

Bryson, V (2021) The Futures of Feminism . Manchester: Manchester University Press (ISBN 978152613851
