= Anna G. Jónasdóttir =

Icelandic political scientist (born 1942)

- Born: Anna Guðrún Jónasdóttir; 2 December 1942 (age 83)

Education
- Education: University of Gothenburg
- Thesis: Love Power and Political Interests (1991)

Philosophical work
- Institutions: GEXcel International Collegium for Advanced Transdisciplinary Gender Studies
- Main interests: Political scientist (gender studies)

Anna Guðrún Jónasdóttir (born 2 December 1942) is an Icelandic political scientist and gender studies academic. She is Professor Emerita at the Center for Feminist Social Studies at Örebro University and co-director of the GEXcel International Collegium for Advanced Transdisciplinary Gender Studies, established as a centre of excellence in gender studies in 2006. She is the author and editor of several books. Anna Jónasdóttir is known, i.a., for her theory of "love power." Her book Why Women Are Oppressed was described as a "thorough attempt to revitalize one of the most provocative early themes of America's women's liberation movement" by The New York Times Book Review. She "explores the concept of women's interests in participatory democratic political theory."

She has a political science, sociology, economic history and psychology background, with a political science doctorate from University of Gothenburg (1991). Her dissertation was titled Love Power and Political Interests. Her main fields of research are social and political theory.

== Selected books ==
- Jónasdóttir, Anna; Jones, Kathleen (1988). The Political interests of gender: developing theory and research with a feminist face. London Newbury Park: Sage Publications. ISBN 9780803980860.
- Jónasdóttir, Anna (1991). Love power and political interests: towards a theory of patriarchy in contemporary western societies. Örebro, Sweden: University of Örebro. ISBN 9789176681169. Published in Spanish under the title El poder del amor: le importa el sexo a la democracia. Madrid Valencia Madrid: Ediciones Cátedra Universitat de València Instituto de la Mujer. 1993. ISBN 9788437611891.
- Jónasdóttir, Anna (1994). Why women are oppressed. Philadelphia: Temple University Press. ISBN 9781566391108.
- Jónasdóttir, Anna; Rosenbeck, Bente; van der Fehr, Drude (1998). Is there a Nordic feminism?: Nordic feminist thought on culture and society. London Philadelphia: UCL Press. ISBN 9781857288780.
- Jónasdóttir, Anna; Jones, Kathleen (2009). The political interests of gender revisited: redoing theory and research with a feminist face. Tokyo New York: United Nations University Press. ISBN 9789280811605. Pdf version.
- Jónasdóttir, Anna; Jones, Kathleen; Bryson, Valerie (2011). Sexuality, gender and power intersectional and transnational perspectives. New York: Routledge. ISBN 9780415880879.
- Jónasdóttir, Anna G; Ferguson, Ann (2014). Love: a question for feminism in the twenty-first century. New York: Routledge Advances in Feminist Studies and Intersectionality. ISBN 9780415704298.

== Literature ==
- Karlsson, Gunnel; Jones, Kathleen (2008). Gender and the interests of love: essays in honour of Anna G. Jónasdóttir. Örebro, Sweden: Örebro University Press. ISBN 9789176686027.
