= Hällefors Municipality =

Hällefors Municipality Hällefors kommun
- Municipality
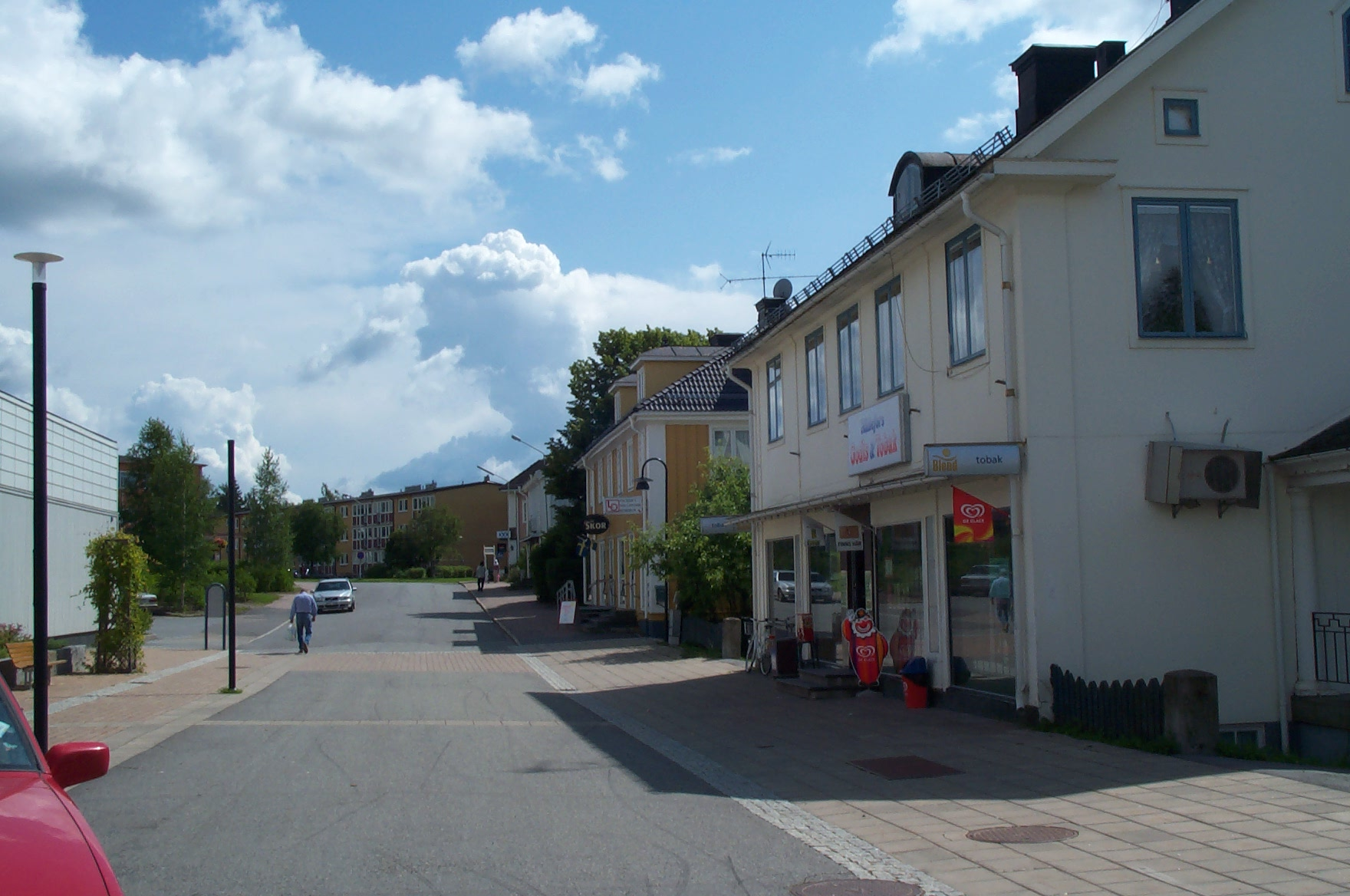

- Coat of arms

- Coordinates: 59°46′N 14°31′E
- Country: Sweden
- County: Örebro County
- Seat: Hällefors

Area
  - Total: 1,151.25 km^{2} (444.50 sq mi)
  - Land: 984.95 km^{2} (380.29 sq mi)
  - Water: 166.3 km^{2} (64.2 sq mi)
- Area as of 1 January 2014.

Population (30 June 2025)
  - Total: 6,265
  - Density: 6.361/km^{2} (16.47/sq mi)
- Time zone: UTC+1 (CET)
  - Summer (DST): UTC+2 (CEST)
- ISO 3166 code: SE
- Province: Västmanland
- Municipal code: 1863
- Website: www.hallefors.se

Hällefors Municipality (Swedish: Hällefors kommun) is a municipality in Örebro County in central Sweden. Its seat is located in the town of Hällefors.

The amalgamations connected with the 1971 municipal reform took place already in 1967 when "old" Hällefors was amalgamated with Grythyttan and the parish of Hjulsjö, which 1965-1966 temporarily had been in Nora Municipality.

The municipality contains diverse natural landscapes offering outdoor activities such as hiking along established trails and nature reserves, fishing and canoeing across more than 400 lakes and waterways, and biking on roads through forested areas.

== Localities ==
- Hammarn
- Hällefors (seat)
- Grythyttan

== Demographics ==
This is a demographic table based on Hällefors Municipality's electoral districts in the 2022 Swedish general election sourced from SVT's election platform, in turn taken from SCB official statistics.

In total there were 6,826 inhabitants, with 5,010 Swedish citizens of voting age. 51.0% voted for the left coalition and 47.8% for the right coalition. Indicators are in percentage points except population totals and income.

Location	Residents	Citizen adults	Left vote	Right vote	Employed	Swedish parents	Foreign heritage	Income SEK	Degree
Location			%	%					
Centrum	1,877	1,215	56.9	41.7	65	61	39	18,293	17
Gillershöjden	1,898	1,509	48.3	50.8	76	78	22	22,235	21
Grythyttan	1,530	1,192	47.0	51.6	79	86	14	23,317	31
Hjulsjö-Kronhagen	1,521	1,094	52.9	45.9	71	72	28	22,284	24
Source: SVT

== Riksdag elections ==
Year	%	Votes	V	S	MP	C	L	KD	M	SD	NyD	Left	Right
1973	91.0	7,062	8.9	64.4		15.4	4.9	1.2	4.9			73.3	25.2
1976	92.2	7,235	7.7	64.5		15.7	5.4	1.5	5.0			72.2	26.1
1979	91.0	7,035	7.8	65.4		11.6	6.0	1.3	7.3			73.1	25.0
1982	91.4	7,023	8.3	65.9	1.1	10.4	3.2	1.7	9.3			74.2	22.9
1985	88.9	6,712	7.4	66.4		7.2	7.8		9.6			73.8	24.7
1988	84.0	6,076	9.2	63.7	4.6	6.9	6.7	1.3	7.6			77.5	21.2
1991	83.4	5,892	7.0	59.0	2.4	6.4	5.0	4.2	10.6		5.1	65.9	26.3
1994	85.2	5,759	9.0	64.5	4.4	5.4	4.0	1.9	9.9		0.6	78.0	21.2
1998	79.9	5,022	17.6	54.6	3.9	3.4	3.3	5.6	10.7			76.2	23.0
2002	75.7	4,478	9.8	62.6	3.0	6.2	6.2	4.3	6.9	0.7		75.4	23.6
2006	79.2	4,540	8.6	57.5	2.7	7.6	2.7	3.0	12.6	3.5		68.8	25.8
2010	82.7	4,556	7.2	51.2	4.5	4.7	3.6	2.5	17.8	7.2		62.9	28.7
2014	82.5	4,398	6.6	47.2	3.1	4.7	2.2	2.1	12.9	18.0		57.0	21.8
2018	84.1	4,289	9.0	39.7	1.8	6.0	2.1	3.4	11.9	24.7		56.6	42.0
2022	81.6	4,016	5.9	38.3	2.6	4.2	2.1	3.1	13.0	29.5		51.0	47.8

== History ==
The area has traditionally been a mining district.

== Industry ==
Hällefors used to be the seat of Hellefors Bruks AB, which in the early 20th century was one of the largest manufacturing companies in central Sweden. It produced iron and steel, mechanical wood pulp, sulfite and sulfate pulp, sawn timber, joinery and box boards. It mined, for its own requirements and for sale, ore from its own iron ore fields. At a large number of its own power stations, situated on Svartälven and its tributaries, the company produced electrical energy which was widely distributed to its own works and outside customers. The company also grew timber on a large scale, and an extensive private railway system runs right through the company's forests which cover several hundred thousand acres in Hällefors and surrounding municipalities. The general management of the company was at Hällefors, where the company operated ironworks, a wood-grinding mill, a sawmill, a box factory and joinery works.

The small town Loka is located in Hällefors Municipality. They are bottling mineral water from their well, that once housed a thermal bath. The water is sold in almost any store in Sweden, including Systembolaget.

== Twin towns ==
Hällefors four twin towns with the year of its establishing:

1. (1978) Pohja (Pojo), Finland
2. (1992) Lüchow, Germany
3. (2001) Orkdal, Norway
4. (2003) Jelgava, Latvia
