= Teresa Rees =

British social scientist (1949–2023)

Dame Teresa Rees DBE FAcSS FLSW
- Born: Teresa Lesley Baggs; 11 June 1949; Wells, Somerset
- Died: 22 September 2023 (aged 74)
- Title: Professor Emerita
- Spouse: Prof Gareth Rees (m. 1974; div. 2004)
- Children: 2

Academic background
- Education: Clifton High School, Bristol
- Alma mater: University of Exeter (BA); University of Wales (PhD)
- Thesis: The reproduction of gender segregation in the labour market (1993)

Academic work
- Discipline: Sociology
- Sub-discipline: Gender studies
- Institutions: Cardiff University; University of Bristol
- Main interests: Gender inequalities in education and the labour market; Gender mainstreaming

Dame Teresa Lesley Rees, DBE, FAcSS, FLSW (11 June 1949 – 22 September 2023) was a British social scientist, and a professor at Cardiff University. She specialised in the analysis of gender equality within education, training and labour market policies.

== Early life and education ==
Teresa Lesley Rees was born in Wells, Somerset on 11 June 1949. She was the oldest of three children born to Violet Elsie "Vera" (nee Geddes-Ruffle) and Gordon Baggs. She was educated at Clifton High School, Bristol before reading Sociology and Politics at University of Exeter, graduating in 1970.

== Career ==
Rees joined Cardiff University as a research fellow in 1973 and held several academic positions there until 1993. During this time, she was credited for her instrumental role in creating the part-time Master of Science programme in Women's studies launched in 1987, the first course of this kind in Wales. She was appointed Director of the Social Research Unit in 1988. Rees also took on doctoral studies at Cardiff, earning her PhD in 1993 with a thesis titled, The reproduction of gender segregation in the labour market.

Between 1993 and 2000, Rees worked at the School of Advanced Urban Studies, University of Bristol as Reader and then as Professor. She returned to Cardiff University in 2000, where she was appointed Pro-vice-chancellor (PVC) for Staff and Students (2004-2007) and for Research (2007-2010).

Rees was professor emerita in the School of Social Sciences at Cardiff University. She was principal investigator for the Women Adding Value to the Economy (WAVE) project, a visiting professor at Sweden's GEXcel International Collegium for Advanced Transdisciplinary Gender Studies, and director of the Leadership Foundation for Higher Education.

=== Honours and recognitions ===
A former Equal Opportunities commissioner, Rees received the Welsh Woman of the Year Award for "outstanding contributions to women in Wales", and in 2002 was made a CBE for her work on equal opportunities and higher education. In 2012, she was elected a Fellow of the Learned Society of Wales. In January 2015, she was made a Dame Commander of the Order of the British Empire (DBE) "for services to social sciences".

Rees was a recipient of honorary doctorates and fellowships from multiple universities, including:

- Queen's University Belfast (DSc, 2012)
- University of Bath (LLD, 2012)
- University of Exeter (LLD, 2015)
- University of Bristol (LLD, 2016)
- University of Aberdeen (DSc, 2016)
- Cardiff University (Fellowship, 2016)
- University of South Wales (DUniv, 2017)

== Personal life and death ==
Dame Teresa Rees died of cancer on 22 September 2023, at the age of 74. She was survived by her two sons.
