= Mats Jansson =

Swedish businessperson (born 1951)

Mats Jansson (born 1951, in Kolsva, Sweden) is a Swedish businessperson. He was Chief Executive Officer of SAS Group from 2007 to 2010.

== Biography ==
Jansson was educated in economics and sociology at the Örebro University, before he started a career in ICA, where he held a range of senior positions from 1973 to 1994. He then worked as CEO of Catena until 1999 when he was hired as CEO of Fazer Group. In 2000 he became CEO of Axfood and in 2005 Chairman of the company while changing to CEO of Axel Johnson. He was hired as CEO of SAS Group in 2007. Jansson is married and has three children, and lives in Switzerland.
