= Berth Danermark =

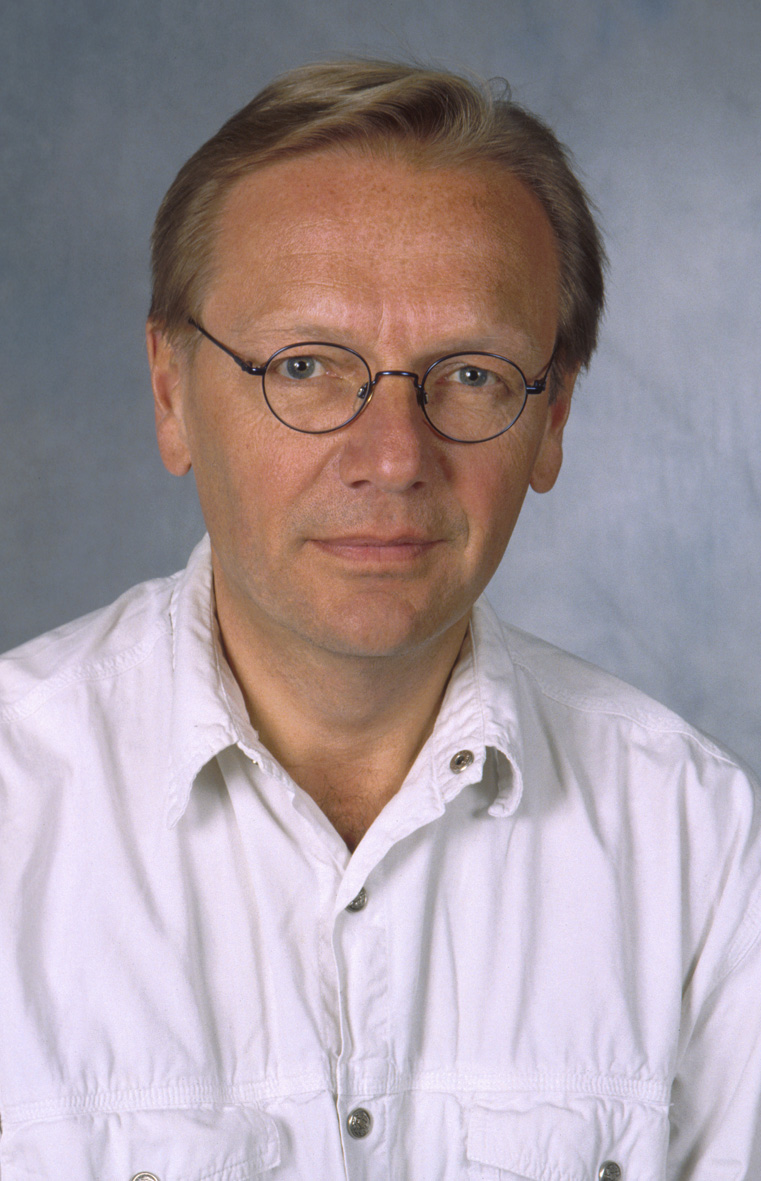
Berth Danermark

Berth Danermark (born July 15, 1951) is currently a Professor Emeritus at Örebro University in Sweden. Danermark has held numerous national and international assignments of importance as well as several management and leadership positions. Danermark attended the University of Uppsala and received his Ph.D. in Sociology (1986). In 1992, he received the qualification of Reader in Sociology from Örebro University.

== Work ==
Danermark began his career as a Senior Lecturer at Örebro University in 1979. From 1984 to 1985 he worked part-time as a Research Leader in the Department of Social Medicine at Medical Centre Hospital. Danermark held the position of Dean for the Department of Sociology at Örebro University beginning in 1987 until 1989 where he became Pro-Vice-Chancellor until 1995. He then worked part-time as Acting professor from January to March 1997; taking on full-time at the beginning of April of the same year. In 1999, he became a Professor at Örebro University. He was one of the creators of The Swedish Institute for Disability Research year 2000. He was the Head of the Doctoral Program in Disability Research at the institute till 2017. His field of expertise is disabilities, interdisciplinary research, and interprofessional collaboration.
