= Cookbook Museum =

Museum in Måltidens hus, Grythyttan, Sweden

Coordinates: 59.7062°N 14.5472°E

The first Nordic Cookbook Museum is located in Måltidens hus, Grythyttan, Sweden. The museum was inaugurated on 17 March 2000 and is operated by the Grythyttan School of Hospitality, Culinary Arts & Meal Science.

== Building ==
The room where the museum is situated is in a specially built black cube, resembling the Kaaba, the most sacred site of Islam. The architect Magnus Silfverhielm, fascinated by Arabic culture, wanted to create a place of pilgrimage for people interested in culinary arts, a bit like a "Mecca" for the like-minded.

The museum has, through the project of interior design and choice of materials, tried to find connections to Tore Wretman. He was one of Sweden's biggest cookbook authors and much of his work is on display at the museum.

== Collection ==
The museum's collection of books and documents dates back to as early as 1480 AD up until 1980 AD. It comprises about a thousand different works, mainly regarding food and culinary arts, but also beverages and their preparation. Most works can be classified as books, but there are also a number of pamphlets and menus. Had it not been for Carl Jan Granqvist, Wretman's books would today have been spread out around the world. The books were auctioned in London in 1997, where Granqvist bought the majority for the Swedish Academy of Culinary Arts & Meal Science.

The museum holds and displays a copy of De honesta voluptate et valetudine (On honest indulgence and good health, often shortened to De honesta voluptate), the world's oldest printed cookbook. Written circa 1465 by Bartolomeo Platina, the Pope's librarian, it was largely a translation into Latin of recipes by Martino da Como from his Libro de Arte Coquinaria (ca. 1465). The book was frequently reprinted over the next century, and translated into French, German and Italian.

There are also books from Cajsa Varg among others, in the museum.

The Cookbook Museum estimate to have around 1500-2000 books as of 2015.

== See also ==
- Food museum
- Food heritage
