= Ann Ferguson =

American philosopher

- Born: March 6, 1938 (age 87)
- Education: BA, 1959, Swarthmore College; PhD, 1965, Brown University
- Institutions: University of Massachusetts Amherst
- Thesis: Some philosophical problems concerning action and desire. (1965)
- Main interests: Feminist theory

Ann Ferguson (born 6 March 1938), is an American philosopher, and Professor Emerita of Philosophy and Women's Studies at the University of Massachusetts Amherst. She served as Amherst's director of women's studies from 1995 to 2001. She is known for her work on feminist theory.

== Career ==
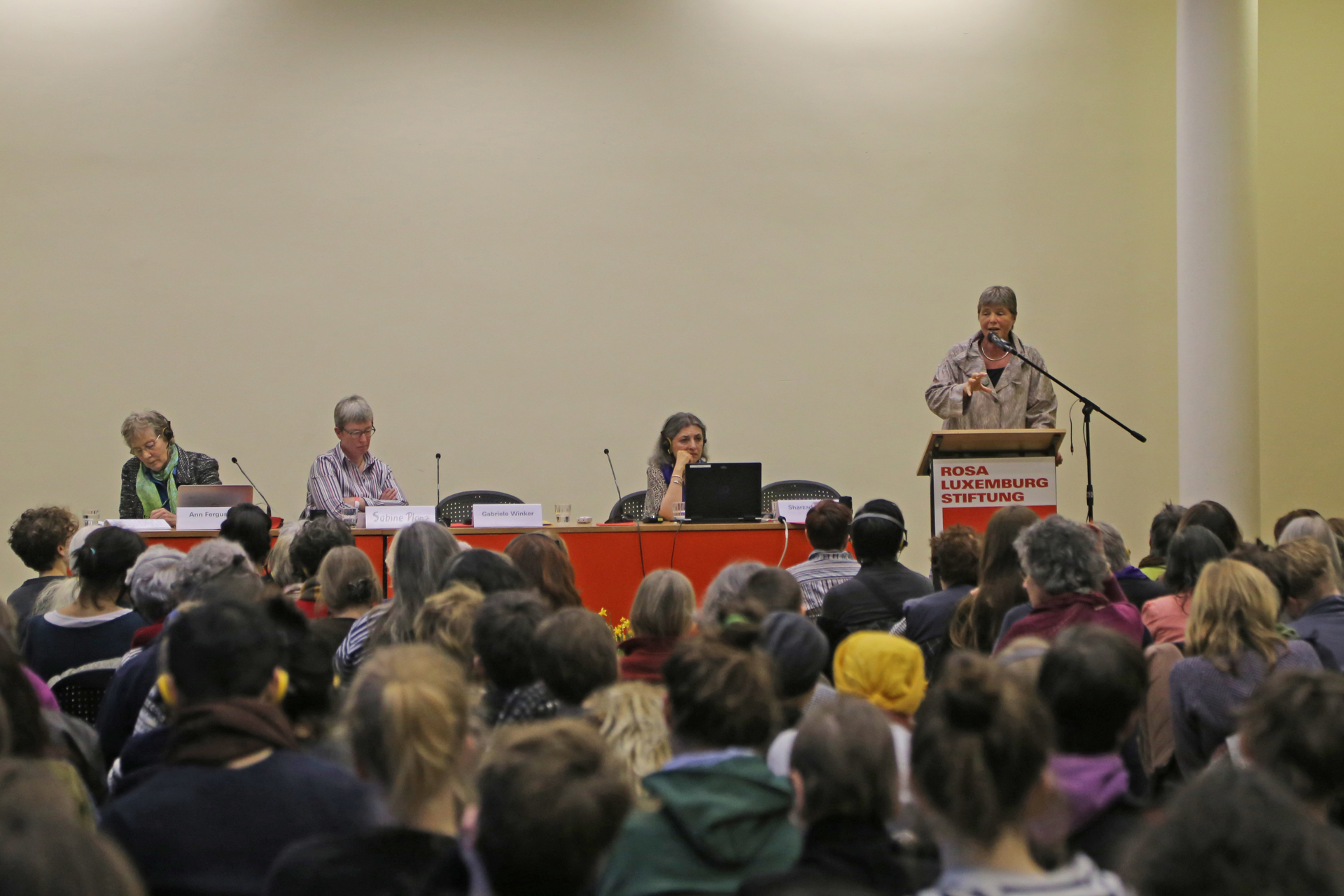
Ferguson, Sabine Plonz, Gabriele Winker, and Sharzad Mojab discussing The strength of Critique: Trajectories of Marxism – Feminism

After earning her PhD from Brown University, Ferguson joined the faculty at the University of Massachusetts Amherst as a lecturer. In 1967, Ferguson began to help her students access then-illegal abortions. By 1995, she was appointed Director of Women's Studies for a three-year term.

She established the Ann Ferguson Women and Gender Studies Scholarship in 2007 before retiring.

== Selected books ==
- Ferguson, Ann (1989). Blood at the root: motherhood, sexuality and male dominance. London: Pandora. ISBN 9780044404453.
- Ferguson, Ann (1991). Sexual democracy: women, oppression, and revolution. Boulder, Colorado: Westview Press. ISBN 9780813307473.
- Ferguson, Ann; Bar On, Bat-Ami (1998). Daring to be good: essays in feminist ethico-politics. New York: Routledge. ISBN 9780415915540.
- Ferguson, Ann; Nagel, Mechthild (2009). Dancing with Iris the philosophy of Iris Marion Young. Oxford New York: Oxford University Press. ISBN 9780195389111.
- Ferguson, Ann; Jónasdóttir, Anna G (2014). Love: a question for feminism in the twenty-first century. New York: Routledge Advances in Feminist Studies and Intersectionality. ISBN 9780415704298.
