= Ali Sadeghian =

Persian-Swedish musician

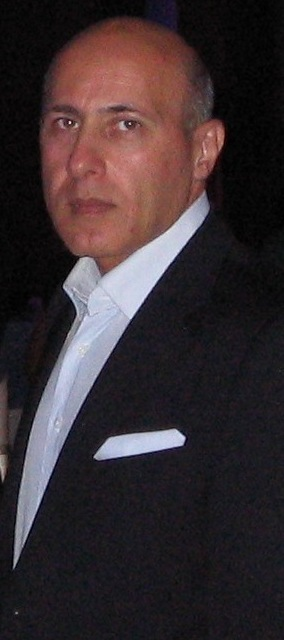
- Born: 1963 (age 62–63); Tehran, Iran
- Website: www.dorefa.com

Ali Sadeghian is a Persian-Swedish musician, singer, songwriter, and actor. He has been living in Sweden since 1984. He studied computer science at Örebro University and has been working as a system engineer since 1991.

Sadeghian started playing music in 1985 with two instruments namely tonbak and daf. The following year, he began to learn how to play santur. A few years later, he began to learn piano and keyboard. For over 10 years, he worked with a music group called Iranian Tones in Sweden. During the same period of time, he also worked with a number of other music groups, ensembles and orchestras in Sweden as well as guest artists from abroad.

== Career ==
To pursue his music career, Ali Sadeghian built his own studio, where he started composing his own music and writing songs. In his artistic endeavors, he has collaborated with Akram Monfared Arya (author, poet, and painter), Mina Boyne (lyricist), and Faryal Shakibi (singer). Sadeghian has held many concerts in a number of locations in Stockholm such as, the Stallet (a well-known concert house), Södrateater (trans., Söder Theatre), Kulturhuset (trans., The House of Culture), Stadshuset (trans., City Hall), several libraries such as, International Library, cultural centres, ABF (adult learning centre), various festivals, churches, and so forth. He has also held concerts in other cities across Sweden. While Sadeghian has extensive experience playing Persian music as well as teaching courses in tonbak, daf, and santur, he is also skilled in playing Western music in various genres.

In spring 2012, Sadeghian released his debut album called Reaching for the stars, which contains 42 songs in different genres. As an artist, he has been featured in media in a variety of articles and interviews.

Sadeghian is a member of Swedish Performing Rights Society STIM, Swedish Musicians' Union Svenska Musikerförbundet (SMF), and Swedish Artists' and Musicians' Interest Organization SAMI.

Sadeghian is also a model and an actor and has appeared in films such as, Bibliotekstjuven, Hamilton: I nationens interesse, The Girl with the Dragon Tattoo, short films such as, Kärlek och Kaffébröd, "Gör det själv då", music videos such as, Sadness is a blessing by Lykke Li, "Speedmarket Avenue-You Can't follow" by Isak Klasson, "Sinner's Heist" by Cantoreggi, "Queer At Heart" by Kristian Kaspersen, and many Swedish TV commercials and TV programmes such as, "Hellenius Hörna".

Between 2012 and 2015, Sadeghian continued his artistic endeavors by producing more songs and composing more music pieces. Furthermore, as an actor, he played in the following television programs: Presskonferens-Komedi Sketch; Hotelräddaren; Svensk hjältar-Är du en vardagshjälte; Svensk hjältar-galan 2014, and television commercials such as ICA Reklam, and films titled: Stockholm Stories; Blå ögon; and Så länge jag lever. Sadeghian also played in the music video "Tiger" in Steve Angello's music album "Wild Youth" which was released in early 2016, and in the music video "Pong Dance" by Vigilands.

Sadeghian's biography was written by Akram Monfared Arya in a book called Alis Historia. The book was later translated into English and published as an eBook in 2018.
