= Christian Lundahl =

Swedish academic

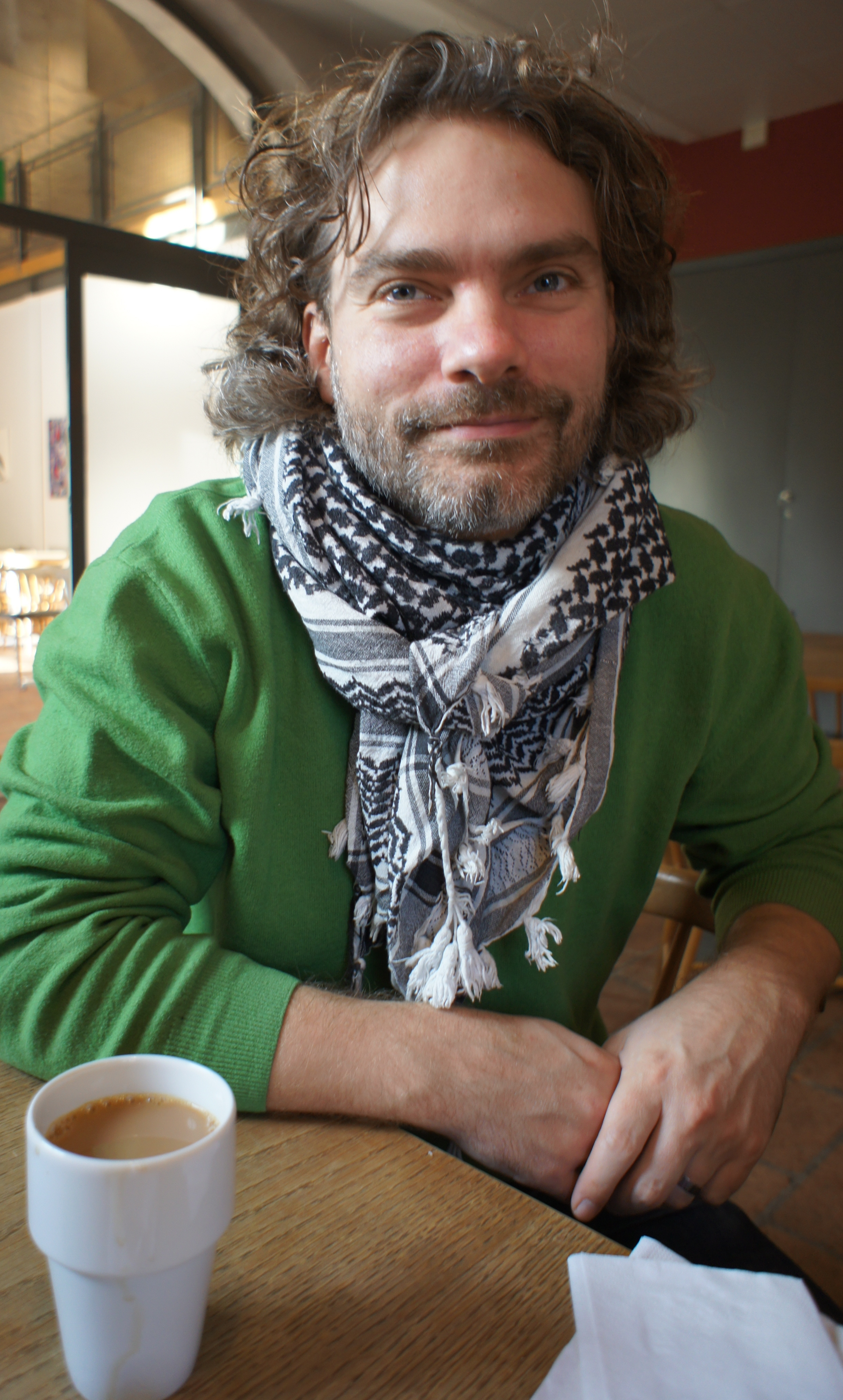
- Christian Lundahl, professor at Örebro University, 2010.
- Born: 18 February 1972
- Education: Uppsala University
- Scientific career
- Fields: Pedagogy
- Workplaces: Örebro University
- Thesis: Viljan att veta vad andra vet. Kunskapsbedömning i tidigmodern, modern och senmodern skola (2006)
- Website: www.skoloverstyrelsen.se

Christian Lundahl (born 18 February 1972) is a Swedish professor of education at Örebro University. Lundahl specializes in the assessment for learning, evaluation and Swedish educational research. Lundahl has worked as a consultant to the National agency of education and the National agency for school inspection on several occasions.
