= Ursula Apitzsch =

German political scientist and sociologist

- Born: November 9, 1947 (age 78)
- Years active: Educator

Academic background
- Education: University of Frankfurt; University of Bremen
- Thesis: Gesellschaftstheorie und Ästhetik bei Georg Lukács bis 1933 (1977); Migration und Biographie (1990)

Academic work
- Discipline: Political scientist and sociologist
- Institutions: University of Frankfurt
- Main interests: Cultural analysis, biographical research, migration, ethnicity and gender
- Website: www.apitzsch.org

Ursula Apitzsch (born 9 November 1947) is a German political scientist and sociologist. Since 1993, she has been Professor of Political Science and Sociology at the University of Frankfurt. Her research fields are cultural analysis, biographical research, migration, ethnicity and gender.

== Biography ==
Apitzsch earned a doctorate at the University of Frankfurt in 1977, with the dissertation Gesellschaftstheorie und Ästhetik bei Georg Lukács bis 1933. In 1990, she earned the Habilitation from the University of Bremen with a thesis entitled Migration und Biographie which examined the education of young Italian migrants in the Rhine-Main region of Germany, and which affected migration studies in Germany. Among her findings was that greater numbers of immigrants in a school led to greater acceptance, providing there was also mixing of social classes. She is a member of the board of directors of the Frankfurt Centre for Women’s and Gender Studies since 1998, chaired the section on biographical research of the Deutsche Gesellschaft für Soziologie 1995–1999, and is a member of research committees of the International Sociological Association. In 2007 she was elected to the Executive Committee of the European Sociological Association.

She has been a visiting professor at the University of California, Berkeley (1992–93), Florence (1994), Rome (1998), Bologna (1999), London (Open University and Tavistock Center, 2000), Brisbane (2002) and CNRS, Paris (2003).

She coordinated an EU research project, Self-employment activities concerning women and minorities, 1997–2001. Until its conclusion in 2005, she was a leader in the EU research project EthnoGeneration, which studied second-generation members of migrant families engaged in business in primarily Northern European countries; she led a follow-up project on female immigrants.

== Selected works ==
- (Ed.) Neurath, Gramsci, Williams: Theorien der Arbeiterkultur und ihre Wirkung. Argument-Sonderbände AS 207. Hamburg: Argument-Verlag, 1993. ISBN 9783886192076
- (Ed.) Migration und Traditionsbildung. Opladen: Westdeutscher Verlag, 1999. ISBN 9783531133782
- (Ed.) Migration, Biographie und Geschlechterverhältnisse. Kritische Theorie und Kulturforschung 6. Münster: Verlag Westfälisches Dampfboot, 2003. ISBN 9783896917065
- (Ed. with Maria Kontos) Self-employment activities of women and minorities: their success or failure in relation to social citizenship policies. Wiesbaden: VS Verlag für Sozialwissenschaften, 2008. ISBN 9783531908168
- (with Sigrid Scheifele, ed.) Migration und Psyche: Aufbrüche und Erschütterungen. Edition psychosozial. Gießen: Psychosozial-Verlag, 2008. ISBN 9783898068642
