= Ottavio Forte =

- Education: Northeastern University, Boston University
- Known for: Participation in the Apollo Missions
- Children: Paolo and Carla
- Scientific career
- Fields: Physics, electrical engineering, spectroscopy
- Workplaces: MIT

Ottavio Forte worked at Boston College. From the City College of New York, he got a B.S. in electrical engineering; from Northeastern, he got an M.S. in electrical engineering, and in Boston University he got his MBA. He has worked for over 22 years at MIT's laboratories, including Draper Laboratory and Lincoln Laboratory. He is most well known for his guidance and landing systems for the Apollo, Poseidon and Trident missions.
