= Francesco Forte =

Francesco Forte may refer to

- Francesco Forte (footballer, born 1991), Italian professional footballer, goalkeeper
- Francesco Forte (footballer, born 1993), Italian professional footballer, forward
- Francesco Forte (footballer, born 1998), Italian professional footballer, defender
- Francesco Forte (politician) (1929–2022), Italian politician and academic
