= Grythyttan =

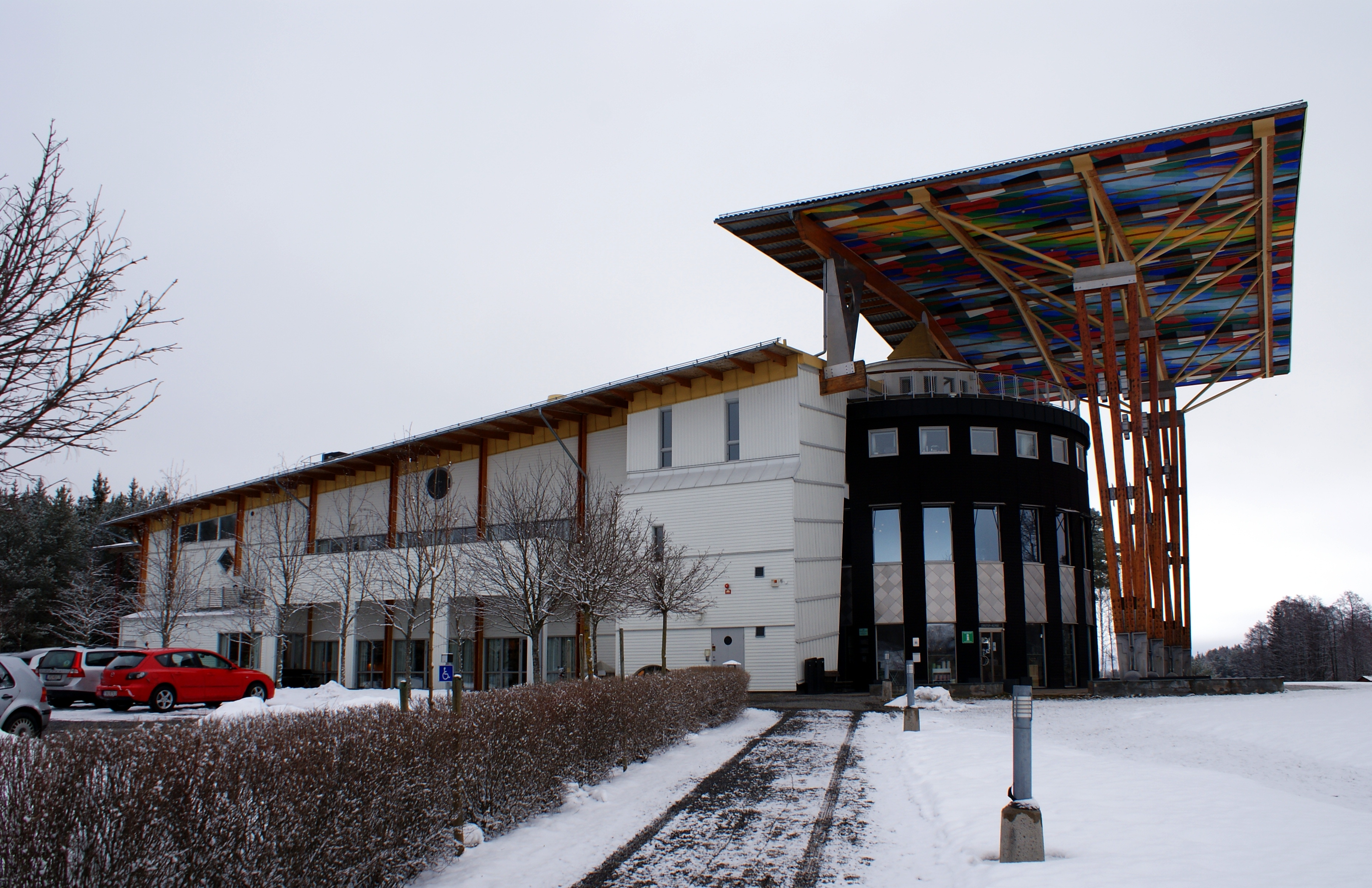
- Måltidens hus, home of Grythyttan Academy for Culinary Arts

- Location within Örebro Location within Sweden
- Coordinates: 59°42′N 14°32′E
- Country: Sweden
- Province: Västmanland
- County: Örebro County
- Municipality: Hällefors Municipality

Area
  - Total: 1.52 km^{2} (0.59 sq mi)

Population (31 December 2010)
  - Total: 891
  - Density: 585/km^{2} (1,520/sq mi)
- Time zone: UTC+1 (CET)
  - Summer (DST): UTC+2 (CEST)

Grythyttan is a locality situated in Hällefors Municipality, Örebro County, Sweden with 891 inhabitants in 2010. It is located between two lakes, Torrvarpen and Sör-Älgen. It is chiefly known in Sweden for the Grythyttan Gästgivargård (restaurant), made famous by its proprietor Carl Jan Granqvist in the late 1970s, and patronised by the pop group ABBA in the 1980s. Other local institutions include the chef and restaurant management school Grythyttan School of Hospitality, Culinary Arts & Meal Science, part of Örebro University, the Cookbook museum, Grythyttan Stålmöbler (garden furniture) and Neerings ice cream and chocolate factory and kiosk. In the center you can also find the Cornelis Vreeswijk museum and pub. The Grythyttans kyrka, build in 1630 is a good preserved property and often used for special occasions.

== Riksdag elections ==
Year	%	Votes	V	S	MP	C	L	KD	M	SD	NyD	Left	Right
1973	89.8	1,328	5.6	58.5		20.8	6.8	1.1	6.6			64.2	34.1
1976	89.5	1,329	5.1	57.9		22.0	4.7	1.5	8.1			63.1	34.8
1979	88.3	1,250	6.0	57.8		17.0	6.5	0.8	11.0			63.8	34.5
1982	88.0	1,253	5.9	58.3	1.0	15.3	3.8	1.9	13.5			64.2	32.6
1985	86.0	1,215	5.1	61.0	1.4	9.0	9.1		14.4			66.1	32.4
1988	81.1	1,125	6.8	59.5	6.4	8.7	8.0	0.5	10.1			72.6	26.8
1991	83.2	1,136	4.5	53.8	4.0	7.0	6.3	5.6	12.9		5.9	58.3	31.8
1994	83.2	1,128	7.8	58.5	5.5	7.7	5.3	2.1	12.1		0.4	71.8	27.5
1998	77.4	1,038	15.1	50.6	4.3	3.2	5.3	6.6	14.3			70.0	29.4
2002	73.3	944	9.3	54.8	4.9	5.8	8.3	5.0	10.4	1.3		69.0	29.4
2006	77.1	1,008	7.0	50.9	4.4	9.1	2.8	2.8	17.9	3.1		62.3	32.5
2010	81.6	1,048	5.5	43.8	7.3	5.6	3.4	2.8	24.2	6.0		56.7	36.1
2014	81.5	1,031	5.2	36.0	6.0	5.5	3.2	2.3	18.8	18.5		47.2	29.9
2018	85.0	1,056	8.3	29.8	3.0	8.6	2.7	3.5	16.6	26.3		49.8	49.1
