= Hällefors =

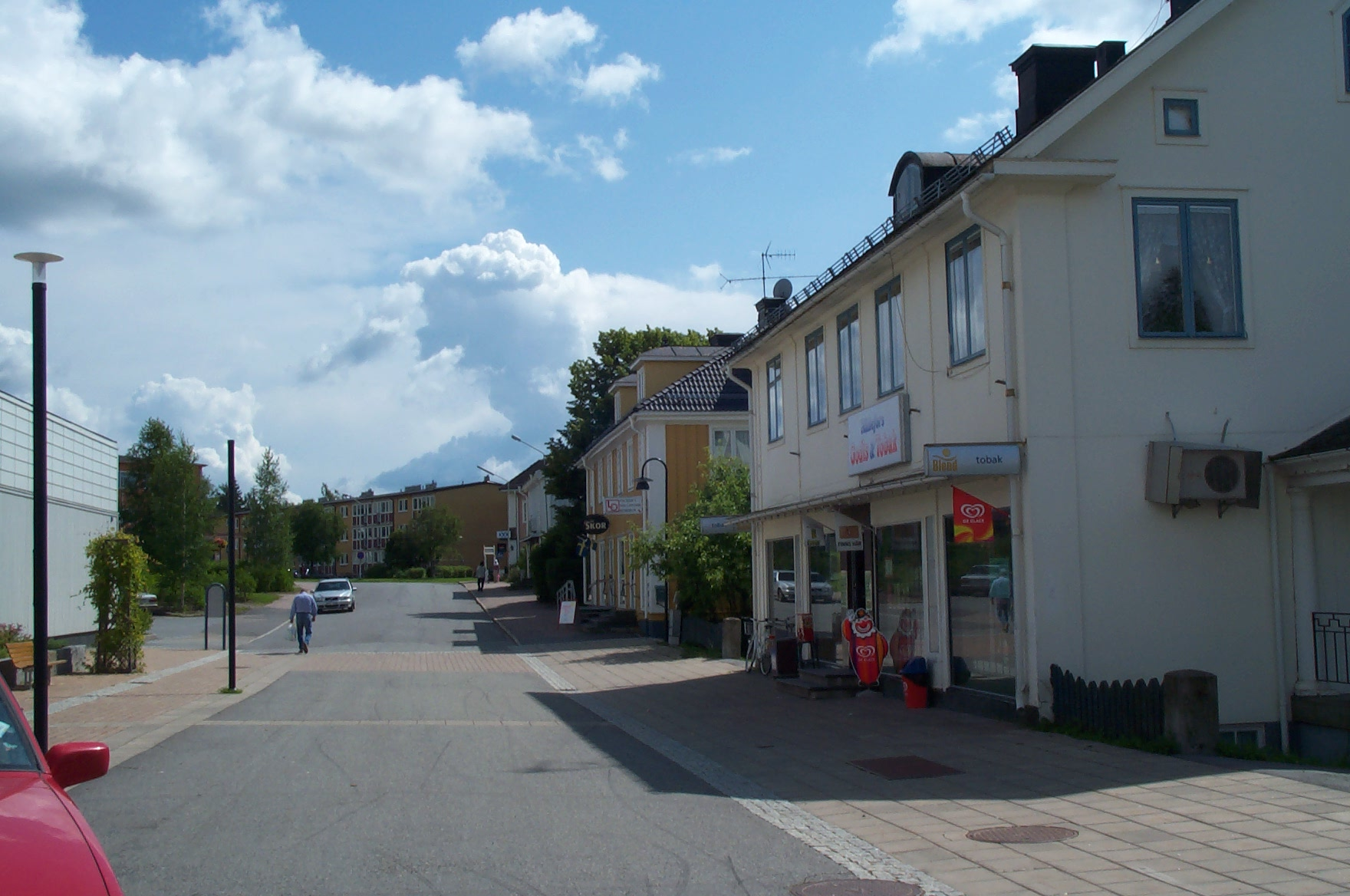
- Summer of 2004 in Hällefors

- Location within Örebro Location within Sweden
- Coordinates: 59°46′N 14°31′E
- Country: Sweden
- Province: Västmanland
- County: Örebro County
- Municipality: Hällefors Municipality

Area
  - Total: 6.33 km^{2} (2.44 sq mi)

Population (31 December 2010)
  - Total: 4,530
  - Density: 716/km^{2} (1,850/sq mi)
- Time zone: UTC+1 (CET)
  - Summer (DST): UTC+2 (CEST)

Hällefors (Swedish pronunciation: [ˈhɛ̂lːɛˌfɔʂ]) is a locality and the seat of Hällefors Municipality, Örebro County, Sweden with 4,530 inhabitants in 2010.
