= Swedish Research Council =

Swedish government agency

- Vetenskapsrådet
- Swedish Research Council English text logo

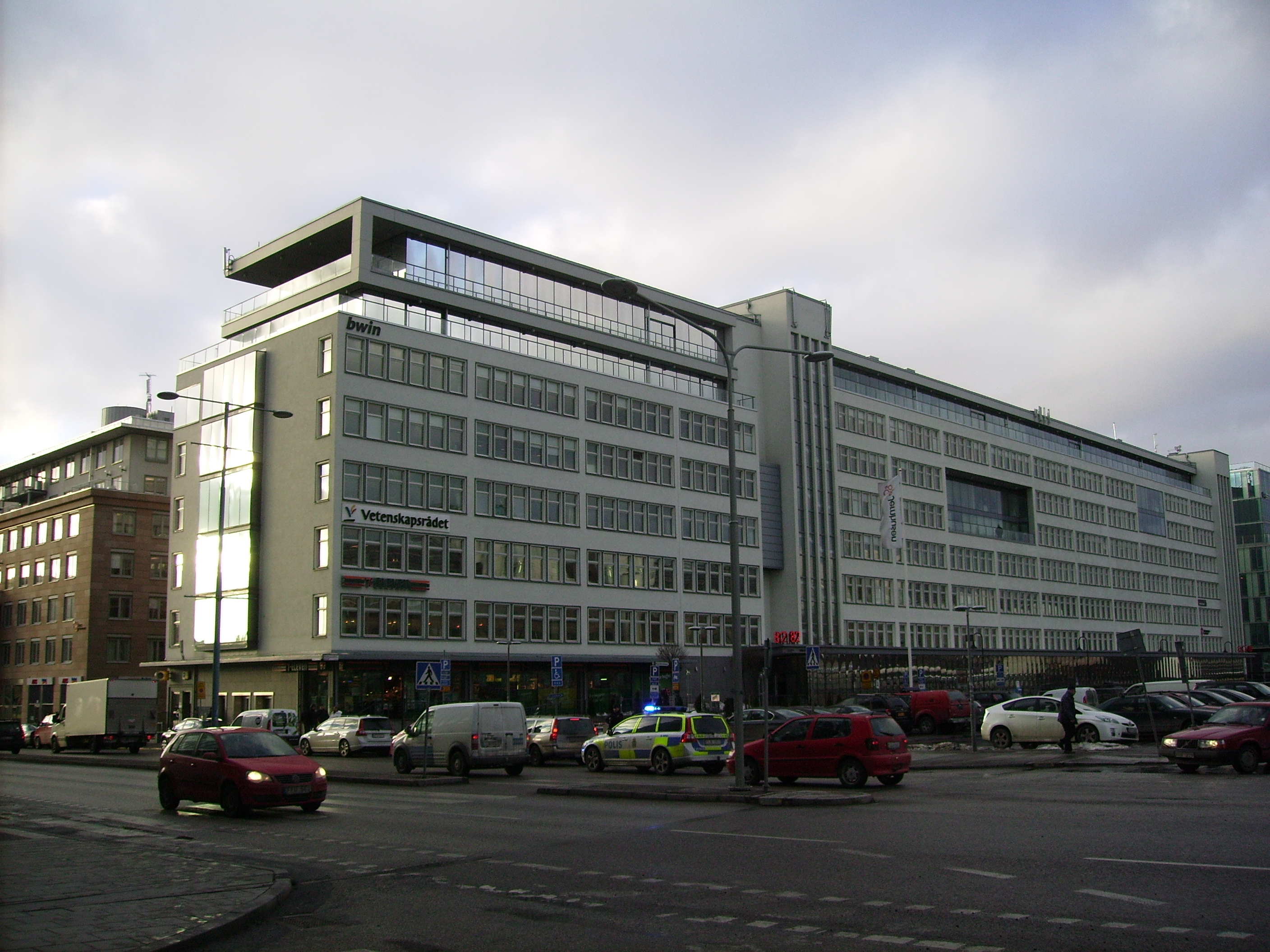
- Main office

Agency overview
- Headquarters: (Sweden) Stockholm
- Employees: 160
- Website: www.vr.se

The Swedish Research Council (Swedish: Vetenskapsrådet) is a Government agency in Sweden established in 2001, with the responsibility to support and develop basic scientific research. Its objective is for Sweden to be a leading nation in scientific research. The agency has three main functions:

- To distribute government funding for basic research
- To advise the government on issues related to scientific research
- To communicate science and scientific research to the general public

== See also ==
- Open access in Sweden
