= Jeff Hearn =

British sociologist

- Born: Jeffery Richard Hearn; 5 August 1947 (age 79)

Academic background
- Education: University of Bradford

Academic work
- Institutions: University of Huddersfield, UK; Hanken School of Economics, Finland
- Main interests: Sociology
- Website: Official

Jeffery Richard (Jeff) Hearn (born 5 August 1947) is a British sociologist, and research professor at the University of Huddersfield, and Professor at the Hanken School of Economics.

== Biography ==
Hearn obtained his MA at the University of Oxford in 1973 and another MA in Organisational Sociology at the University of Leeds in 1974, and his PhD in Social Theory, Social Planning and Theories of Patriarchy at the University of Bradford in 1986.

Hearn has been Lecturer, Senior-Lecturer, Research Fellow, Visiting professor, Professor and the like at universities in Bradford, Manchester, Sunderland, Åbo and elsewhere. He is currently teaching as a professor at the "Hanken School of Economics" in Helsinki and Linköping University, Sweden. He is also Professor of Sociology, Huddersfield University, and a UK Academician in the Social Sciences.

Jeff Hearn is a member of the British Sociological Association, since 2005 member of the Conference and Events Committee of BSA. He is co-editor of Men and Masculinities, managing co-editor of Routledge Advances in Feminist Studies and Intersectionality, and associate editor of many other journals.

== Work ==
Hearn's research interests range from critical studies on men, including men's violences to women and children; Sociology of organisations and management, including gender, sexuality and violence in and around organisations; Globalisation and transnationalism, with a focus on men, organisations, management and social welfare; and social theory; to sociology of culture.

=== First publications ===
His first published book was in 1983, a materialist analysis of men's relations to children, followed by the book, "'Sex' at 'Work'", authored with Wendy Parkin, in 1987, on the power and paradox of 'organisation sexuality', a book on sexuality in organisations, and then "The Gender of Oppression", a neo-marxist, pro-feminist critique of contemporary patriarchy in the same year.

His later books include "Men in the Public Eye" (Routledge, 1992), "The Violences of Men" (Sage, 1998), "European Perspectives on Men and Masculinities" (with Keith Pringle and members of CROME, Palgrave Macmillan, 2006, 2009).

A review of some of his work on men and masculinities is to be found in the book: Fidelma Ashe 'The New Politics of Masculinity', Routledge, 2006, and another on his work with Wendy Parkin on gender, sexuality and organisations in the book: Tommy Jensen and Timothy L: Wilson (eds.) On the Shoulders of Giants, Studentlitteratur, 2011.

=== Critical studies on men ===
With David Morgan, Colin Creighton, Chris Middleton, Ray Thomas and Clive Pearson, he initiated some ground rules for the study of men and masculinity, published as 'Changing men's sexist practice in sociology', Network, No 25, January 1983. Following work in the Men and Masculinity Research/Study Group at Bradford, the principles were developed and published in Achilles' Heel in 1987, and 3 years later Hearn and Morgan appended a sixth in the book "Men, Masculinities and Social Theory".

== Selected publications ==
- Hearn, Jeff (1992). Men in the public eye: the construction and deconstruction of public men and public patriarchies. Critical studies on men and masculinities 4. London New York. ISBN 9780415076203.
- Hearn, Jeff (1998). The violences of men: how men talk about and how agencies respond to men's violence to women. London. ISBN 9780803979406.
- Hearn, Jeff; Popay, Jennie; Edwards, Jeanette (1998). Men, gender divisions and welfare. London New York. ISBN 9780415119719.
- Hearn, Jeff; Parkin, Wendy (2001). Gender, sexuality and violence in organizations: the unspoken forces of organization violations. London. ISBN 9780761959120.
- Hearn, Jeff; Heiskanen, Tuula (2004). Information society and the workplace: spaces, boundaries and agency. London. ISBN 9780415272230.
- Hearn, Jeff; Kimmel, Michael; Connell, Raewyn (2005). Handbook of studies on men and masculinities. Thousand Oaks, California: Sage. ISBN 9780761923695.
- Hearn, Jeff; Pringle, Keith (2006). Men and masculinities in Europe. London: Whiting & Birch. ISBN 9781861770424.
- Hearn, Jeff; Pringle, Keith (2006). European perspectives on men and masculinities: national and transnational approaches. Basingstoke England New York: Palgrave Macmillan. ISBN 9781403918130. Paperback, 2009 ISBN 9780230594470
- Hearn, Jeff; Burr, Viv (2008). Sex, violence and the body: the erotics of wounding. Houndmills, Basingstoke, Hampshire England New York: Palgrave Macmillan. ISBN 9780230549340.
- Hearn, Jeff; Piekkari, Rebecca; Jyrkinen, Marjut (2009). Managers talk about gender: what managers in large transnational corporations say about gender policies, structures and practices (PDF). Helsinki, Finland: Edita publishing.
- Hearn, Jeff; Husu, Liisa; Lämsä, Anna-Maija; Vanhala, Sinikka (2010). Leadership through the gender lens: Women and men in organizations (PDF). Helsinki, Finland: Edita publishing.
- Hearn, Jeff; Pringle, Keith; Ruspini, Elisabetta; Pease, Bob (2011). Men and masculinities around the world: transforming men's practices. New York, New York: Palgrave Macmillan. ISBN 9780230107151.
- Hearn, Jeff; Olesky, Elżbieta H.; Golanska, Dorota (2013). Limits of gendered citizenship: contexts and complexities. Oxford New York: Routledge. ISBN 9780415851268.
- Hearn, Jeff (March 2013). "The sociological significance of domestic violence: Tensions, paradoxes and implications" (PDF). Current Sociology. 61 (2). Sage: 152–170. doi:10.1177/0011392112456503. S2CID 144916812. Pdf.
- Hearn, Jeff (2015). Men of the world genders, globalizations, transnational times. Thousand Oaks, California London: Sage. ISBN 9781446207185.
