= Örebro University =

University in Sweden

- Örebro universitet
- Motto: Dulce est sapere (knowledge is sweet)
- Type: Public
- Established: 1977; 49 years ago as college, 1999; 27 years ago as university
- Vice Chancellor: Åke Ingerman
- Academic staff: 1000
- Administrative staff: 500
- Students: 16,000 (FTE, 2014)
- Location: Örebro, Örebro, Sweden; 59°15′16″N 15°14′43″E
- Campus: Urban
- Website: https://www.oru.se/english

Örebro University (Swedish: Örebro universitet) is a public research university in Örebro, Sweden.

The university has its roots in the Örebro campus of Uppsala University, and became an independent state university college in 1977, Örebro University College (Högskolan i Örebro). The university college also incorporated three other existing educational institutions in Örebro: the teaching seminar, the sports college (founded in 1966) and the social work college (founded 1967). Örebro University College was granted the privileges of a university by the Government of Sweden in 1999, becoming the 12th university in Sweden.

On 30 March 2010 the university was granted the right to award medical degrees in collaboration with Örebro University Hospital, making it the 7th medical school in Sweden.

The law programme at Örebro University is one of Sweden's most popular programmes (number 10 in 2018, with more than 4,800 applicants).

== History ==
In 1967, Uppsala University established a branch in Örebro, the College of Social Sciences. In 1977, Örebro University College was established through a merger of the Uppsala University branch in Örebro, the Preschool Teaching Seminary, and the College of Physical Education and Sport Science, and the College of Social Sciences. In 1999, the university college was granted the status of a university by the Government of Sweden and opened by then Prime Minister Göran Persson on 6 February 1999.

== Rankings ==
University rankings

Global – Overall
- ARWU World: 701–800 (2024)
- THE World: 601–800 (2024)
- USNWR Global: =667 (2023)

Örebro University is ranked number 84 on the Times Higher Education's list of the best young universities in the world. This list includes only universities established less than 50 years ago.

== Faculties ==
- Faculty of Business, Science and Engineering
- Faculty of Humanities and Social Sciences
- Faculty of Medicine and Health

== Schools ==
- Business School
- School of Health Sciences
- School of Hospitality, Culinary Arts and Meal Science
- School of Humanities, Education and Social Sciences
- School of Law, Psychology and Social work
- School of Medical Sciences
- School of Music, Theatre and Art
- School of Science and Technology

== Vice-Chancellors ==
- Thore Hammarland (1977–1978)
- Stefan Björklund (1978–1982)
- Anders Stening (1983–1989)
- Ingemar Lind (1990–1999)
- Janerik Gidlund (1999–2008)
- Jens Schollin (2008–2016)
- Johan Schnürer (2016–2026)
- Åke Ingerman (2026–present)

== Notable people ==
=== Alumni ===
- Lars Adaktusson, Member of the European Parliament
- Stefan Borsch, vocalist, Vikingarna (1973–1979)
- Johan Dennelind, CEO, Telia Company
- Lars Joel Eriksson, politics editor, Skånska Dagbladet
- Sven-Göran Eriksson, Football manager
- Fredrick Federley, Member of Parliament, Centre Party
- Nataliya Gumenyuk, Ukrainian journalist, teacher
- Mats Jansson, CEO, SAS Group (2007–2010)
- Hans Karlsson, Minister for Employment
- Ulrika Knape, Olympic medalist in diving (1972 and 1976)
- Marika Domanski Lyfors, coach of the Swedish women's national football team (1996–2005)
- Pernilla Månsson Colt, television host
- Rickard Olsson, television and radio host
- Göran Persson, Swedish Prime Minister (1996–2006)
- Ali Sadeghian, musician, singer, songwriter, and actor
- Elisabeth Svantesson, Minister of Finance, Member of Parliament, Moderate Party
- Sten Tolgfors, Minister for Defense and Foreign Trade, Member of Parliament, Moderate Party
- Niklas Wykman, Minister of Financial Markets, Member of Parliament Moderate party

=== Faculty ===
- Berth Danermark, a professor at the university
- Fuat Deniz, sociology, killed on campus on 13 December 2007
- Anna G. Jónasdóttir, political science, gender studies; Professor Emerita
- Christian Lundahl, professor of education

== Student Life ==
=== Student Union ===
The student union called "Örebro studentkår" shortened "ÖS" was created 1963 and represents all students at Örebro University.

Örebro Student Union collaborates and is in constant contact with the university and the municipality to speak on behalf of students in the decisions that affect them. Among other things, the Student Union has student representatives in the Faculty Boards – which are part of the university's central management.

Örebro Student Union is a democratic, non-political organisation which is ruled by the students themselves as a whole, but to make things easier there are different departments that run the actual work in the student union, the most important ones being the student council and the student union board.

==== Student council ====
The Student Council is the organisation's highest decision-making body. Simply translated, the general council is Örebro Student Union's own parliament. The role of the Student Council today is to set the overall direction for Örebro Student Union as an organization and activities and to be responsible for the full-time remunerated employees who are elected by the Student Council.

The council consists of 41 members where each union section is represented; the members are elected by the union section's members to represent the union section and speak on its behalf. Every ordinary member of Örebro Student Union has the right to submit points to the Student Council.

The council meets four to five times a year, when they vote on various issues that affect or have been submitted by the students. A couple weeks before each voting session the student council assembles for an opinion meeting where all documents that will be brought up at the time of the vote will be reviewed. This is so that the council's members can ask questions and make themselves familiar with the issue for them to bring it back to their respective sections for their opinion as well as being able to discuss and exchange ideas before the actual voting meeting which will reduce the amount of time needed to make an actual decision.

==== Student union board ====
Directly subordinate to Örebro Student Union's (ÖS) council is the union board – Örebro Student Union's highest executive body.

The union board consists of the president of ÖS, the two vice presidents of ÖS and one member from each section (usually the president or vice president of the section). The main task of the Student Union Board can be summarized as implementing the council's decisions and managing the organization.

=== Kårsektionerna ===
The student union is divided into sections "Kårsektioner" that represent the different programs and faculties that are available at Örebro University. Örebro studentkår have 10 different sections called; Corax, DokSek, GIH, Grythyttan, Nexus, Qultura, Serum, Sesam, Sobra and TekNat.

Nexus is the official student section at Örebro University that represents all international students at undergraduate and graduate level. The section was established in 2024, replacing the former student association ESN (Erasmus Student Network) Örebro, which had been previously serves as the main organization supporting and representing international student at the university.

Each student section has its own given colour which also translates onto their student overall, or "Ovve". The different colours help in identifying different sections from each other, for example during the student introduction or just on a night out at the student club.

Colour	Section	Program/Faculty
Yellow	SERUM	School of Medical Sciences, School of Health Sciences (except the sports subject)
Purple	TekNat	School of Science and Technology
Red	Corax	School of Humanities, Education and Social Sciences
Black	SOBRA	School of Law, Psychology and Social work
Dark Blue	Sesam	Business School
Orange	GIH	School of Health Sciences (sports subjects)
Pink	Qultura	School of Music, Theatre and Art
Wine Red	Grythyttan	School of Hospitality, Culinary Arts and Meal Science
Light Blue	Nexus	All incoming international exchange students, All international master students
Gray	DokSek	All doctoral students

== Gallery ==
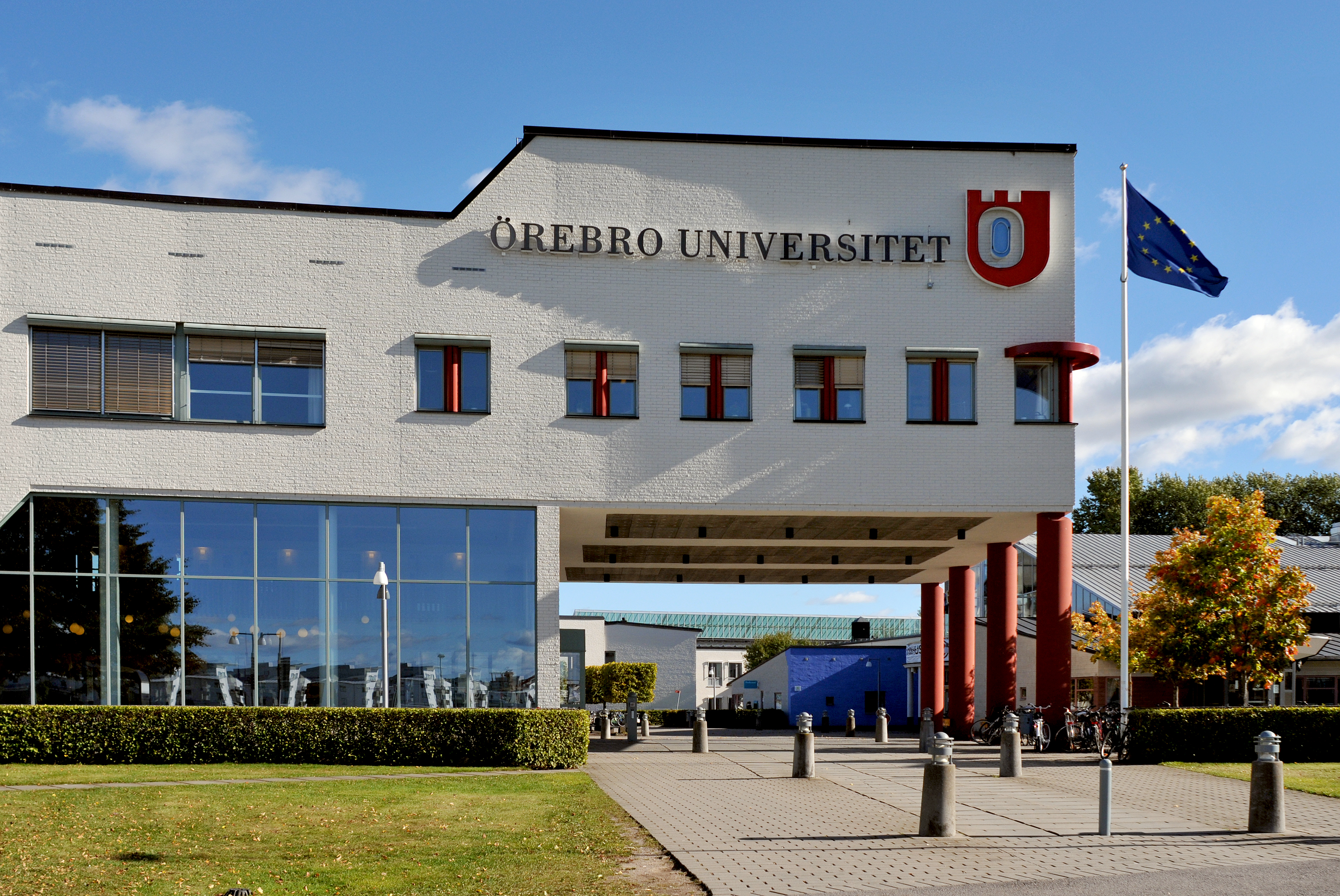
Main Building

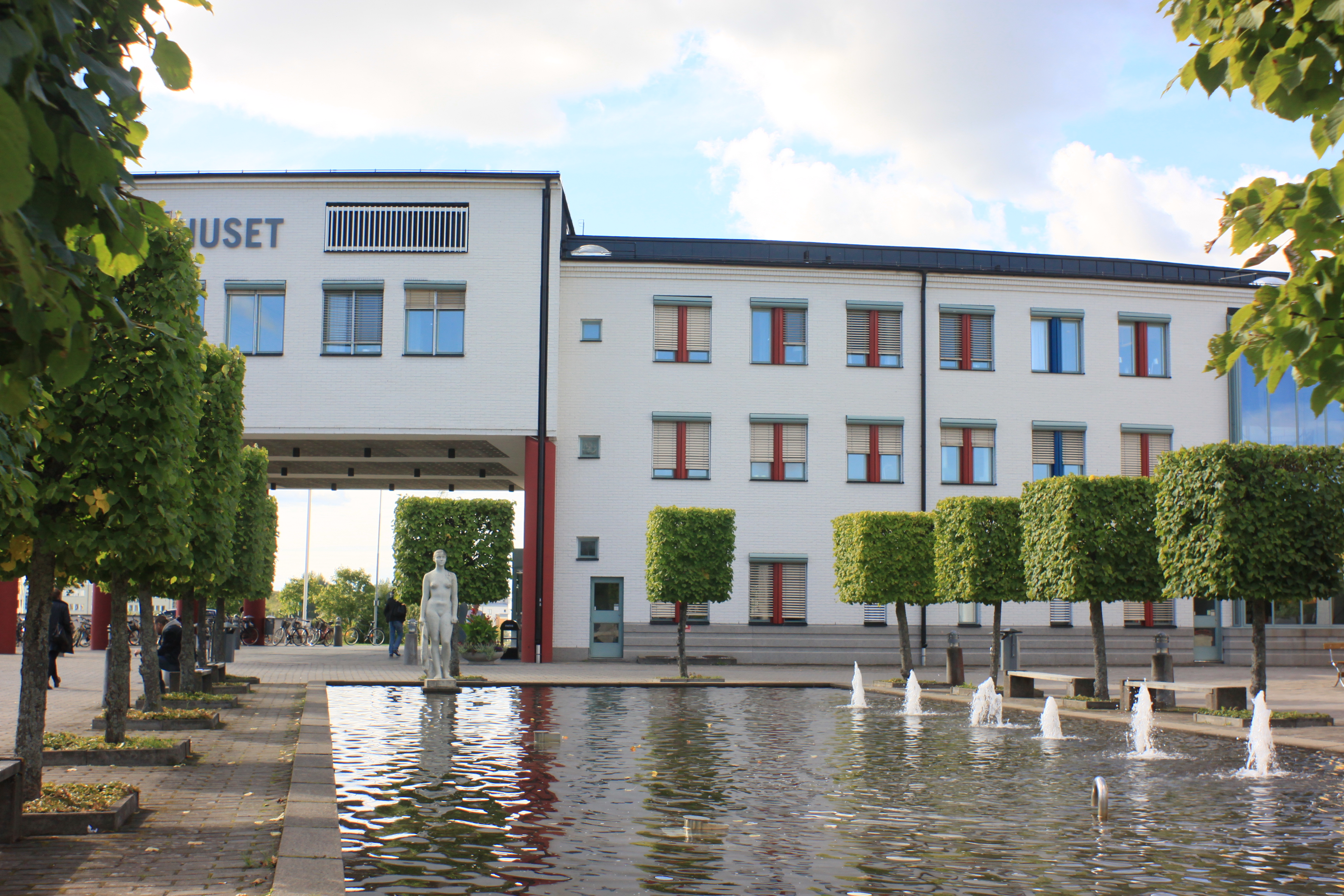
Campus pool

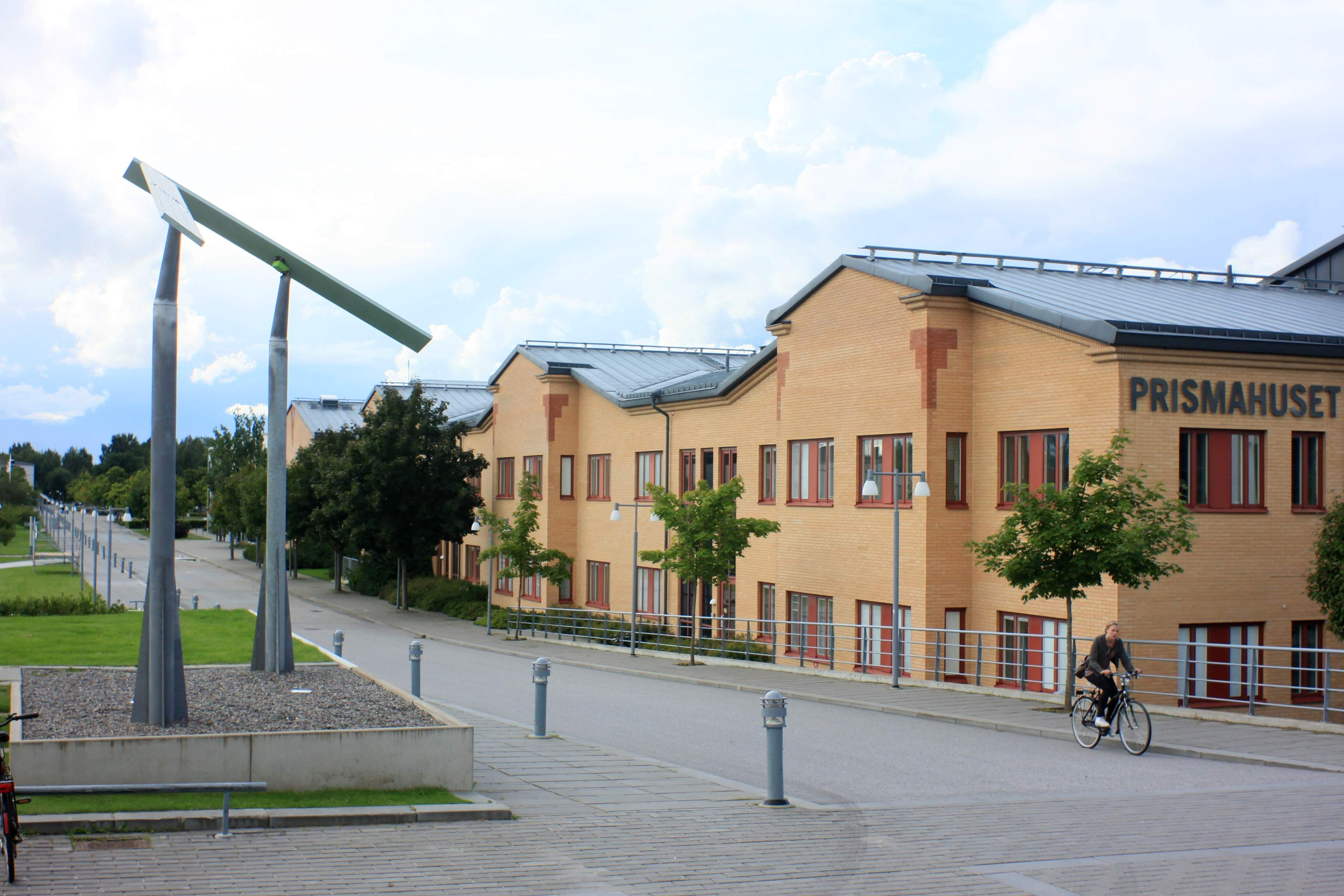
Prisma House

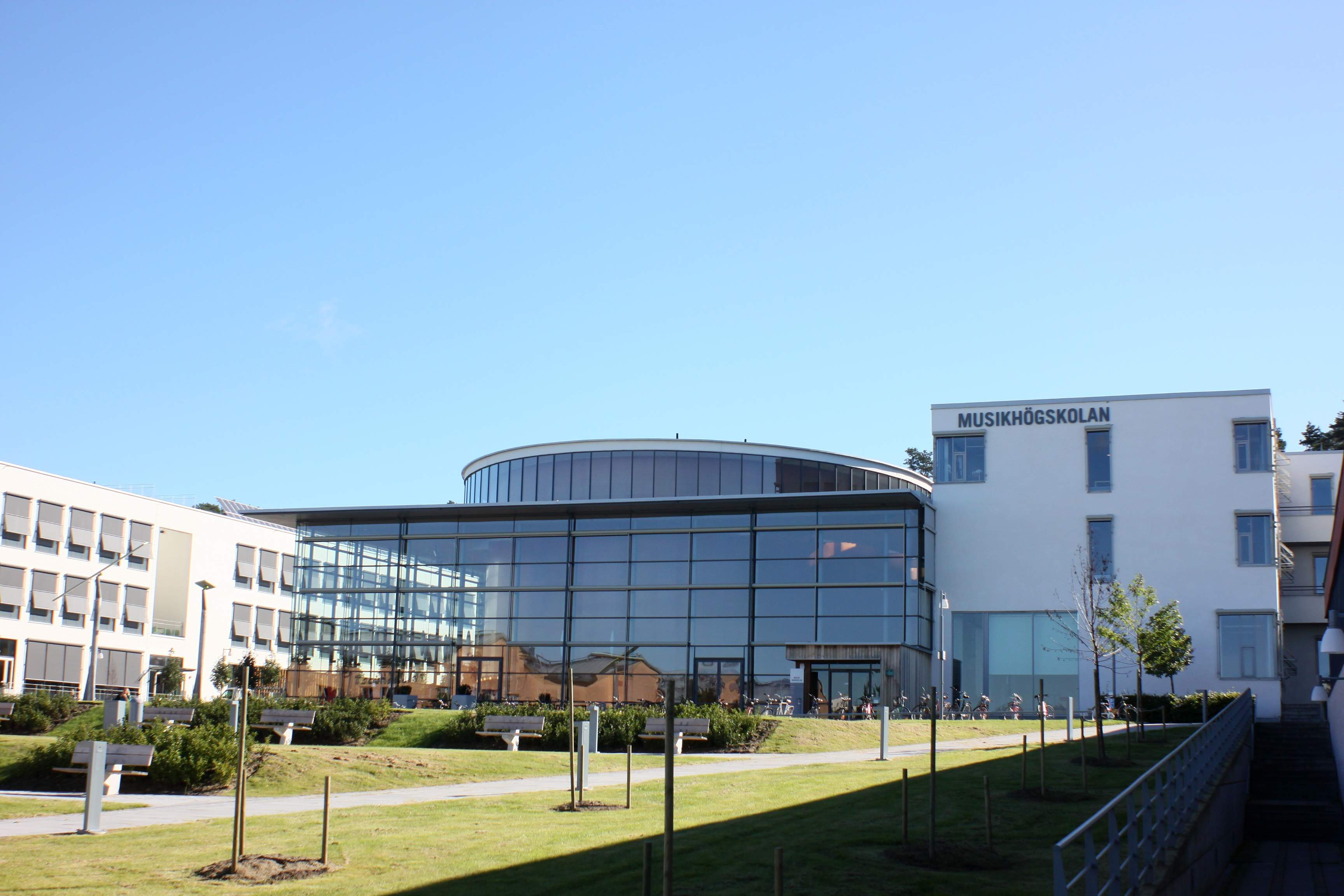
School of Music

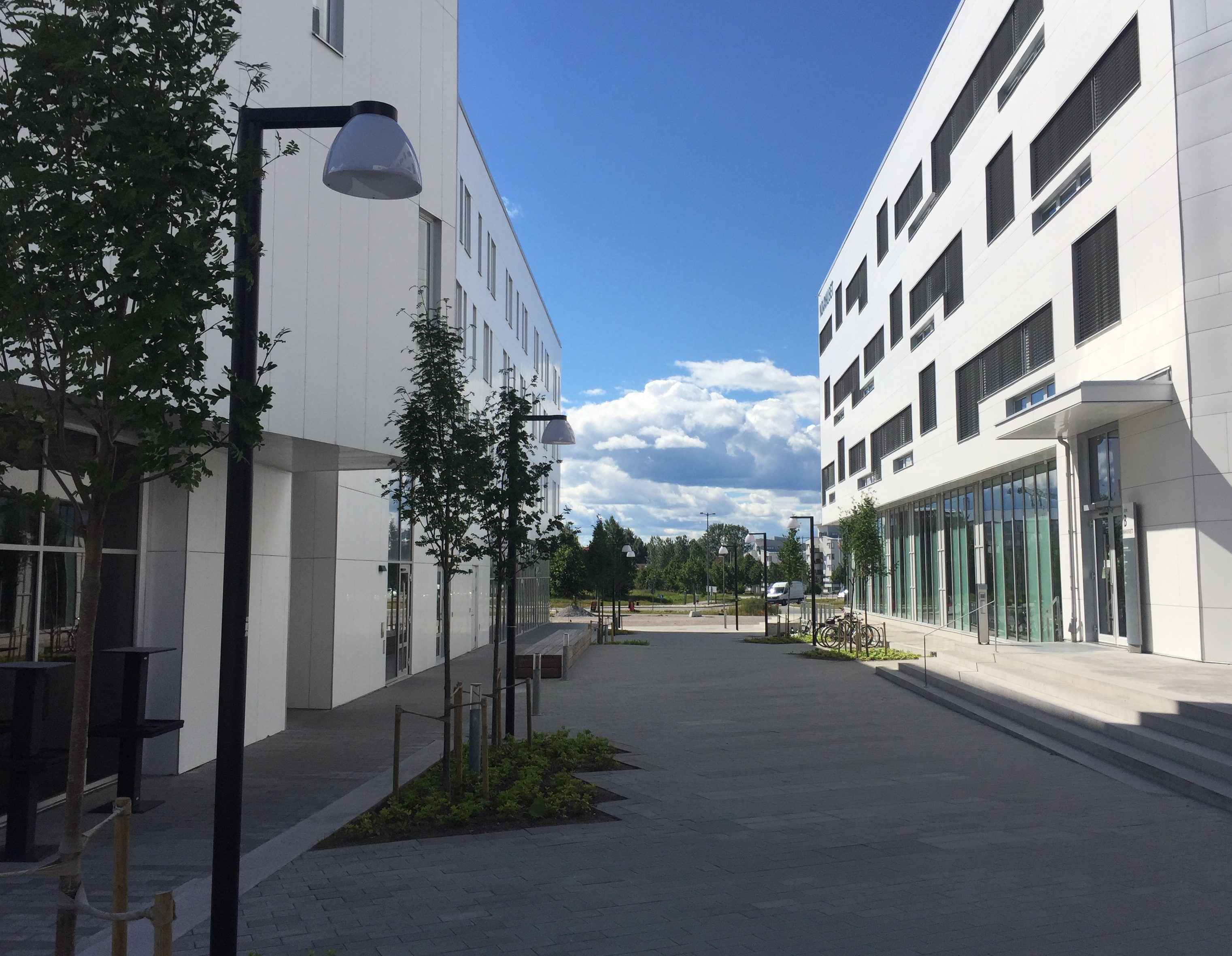
Street at Campus

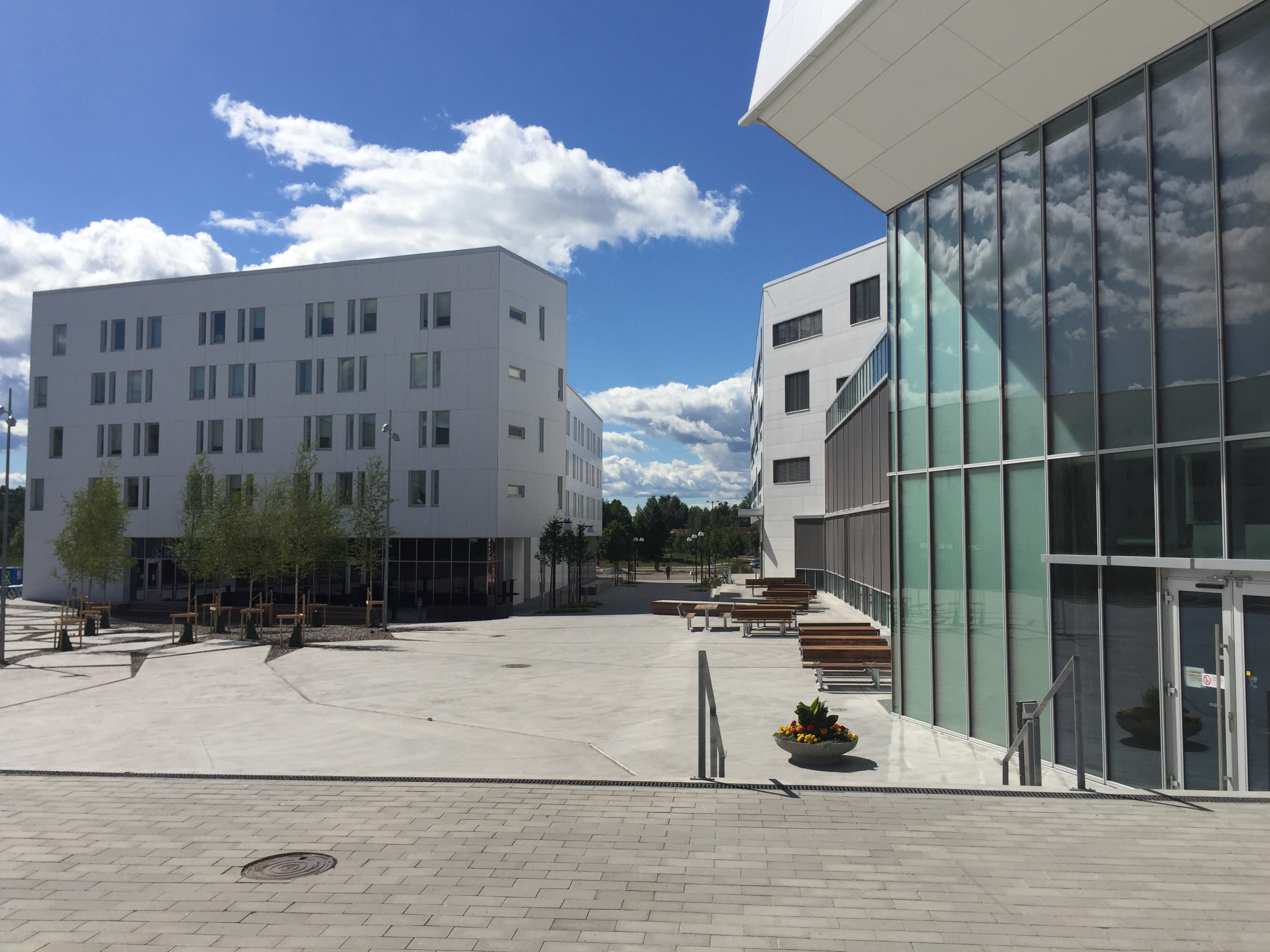
Campus square

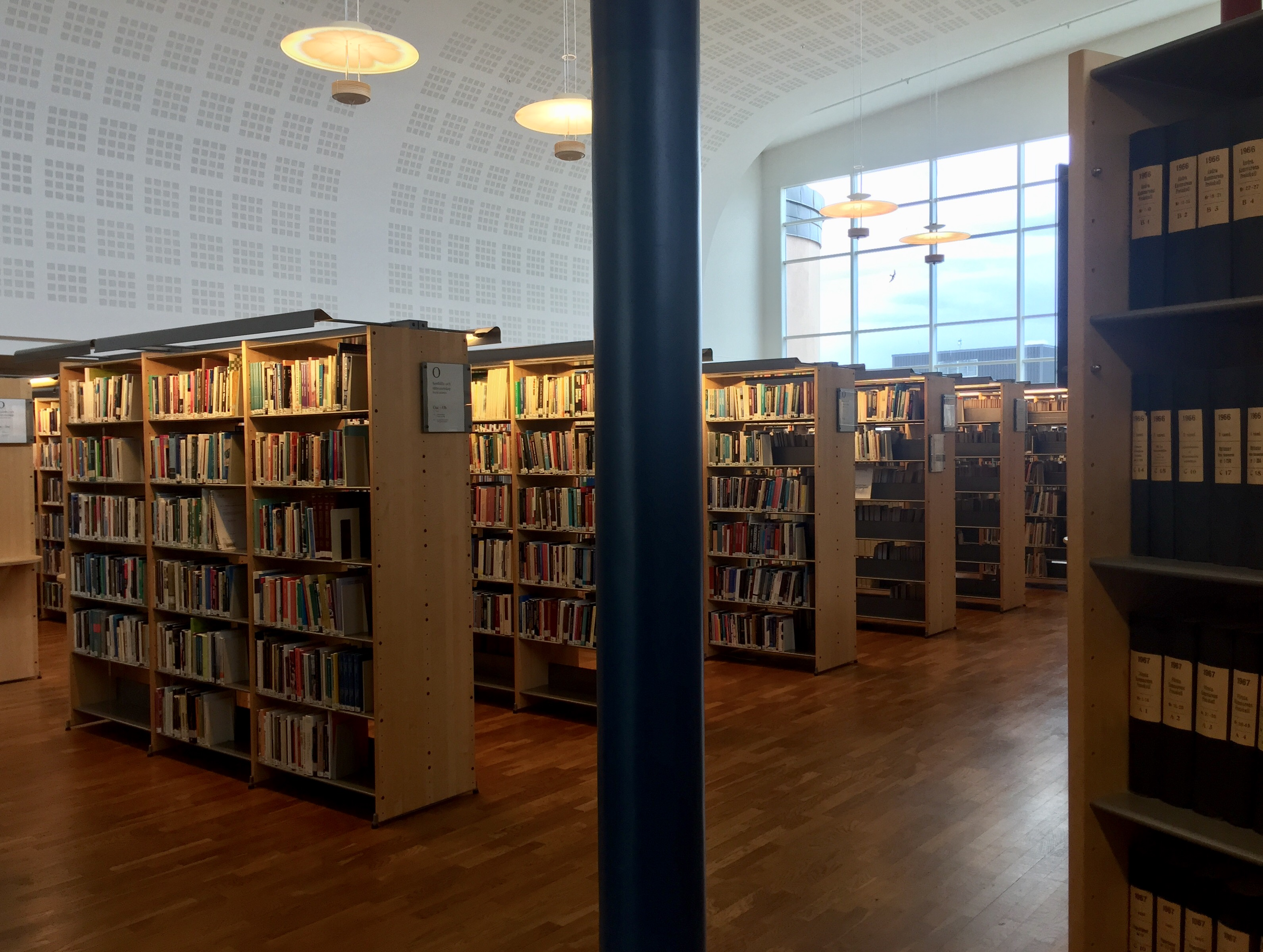
University Library

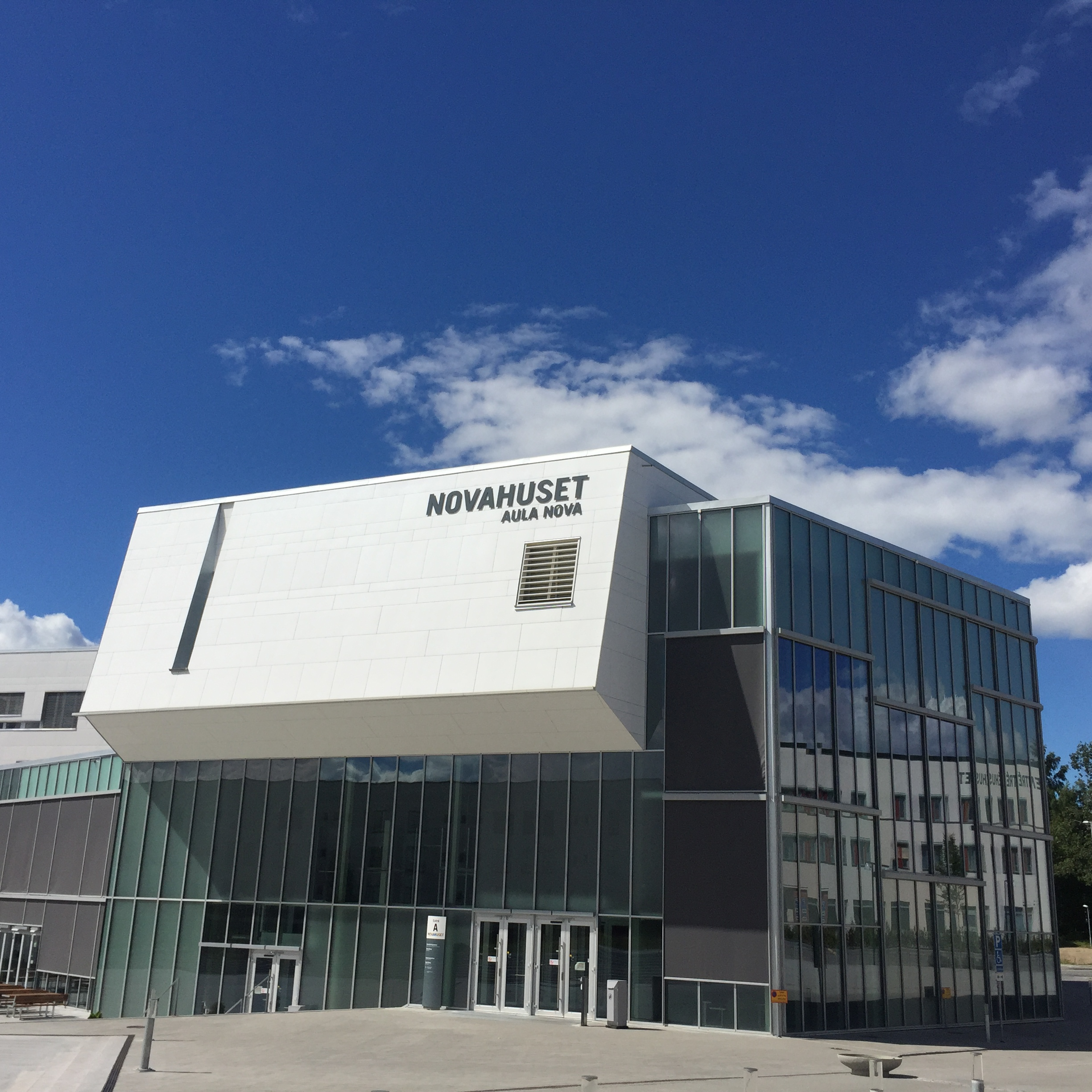
Nova Building

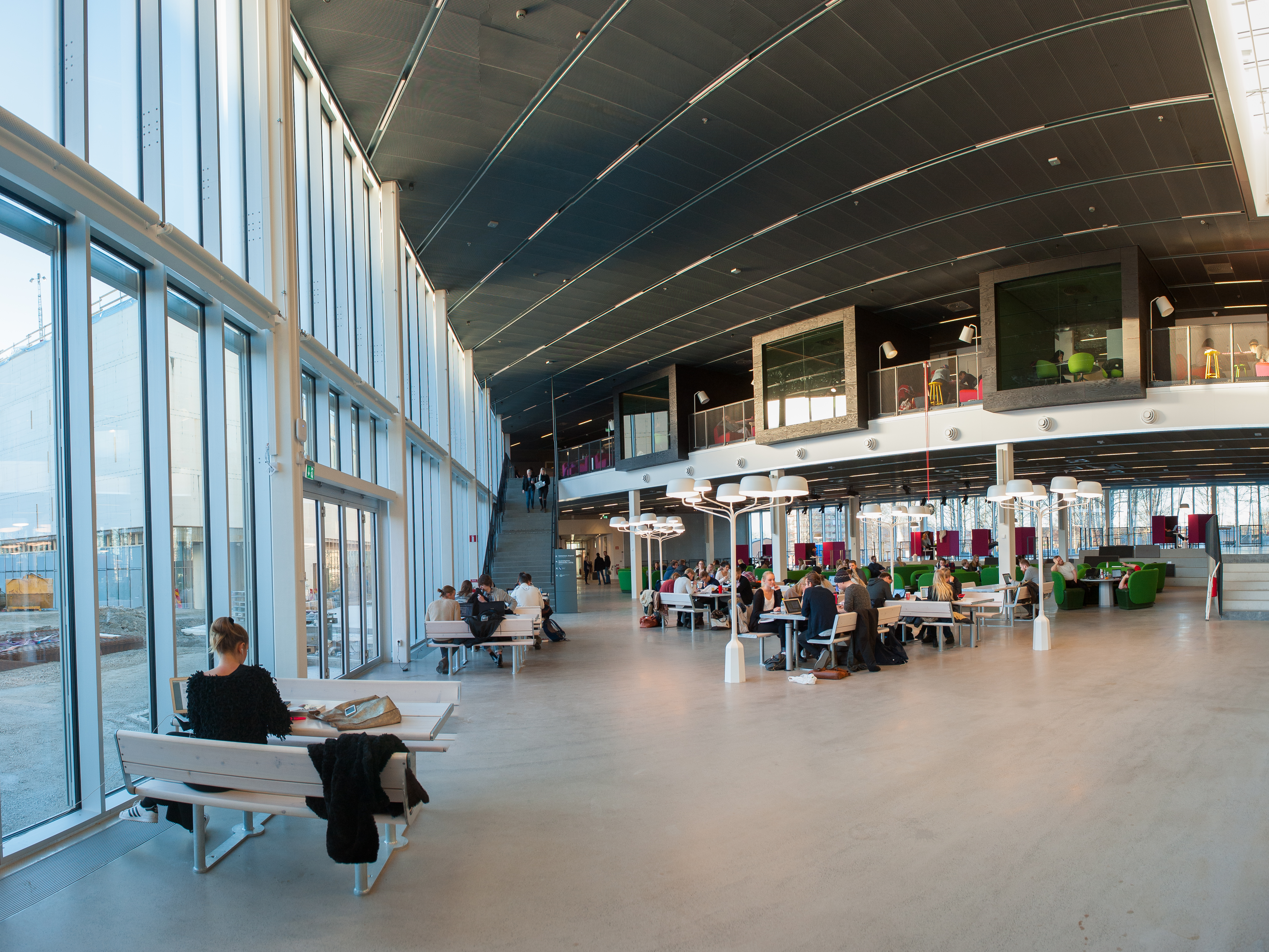
Inside Nova Building

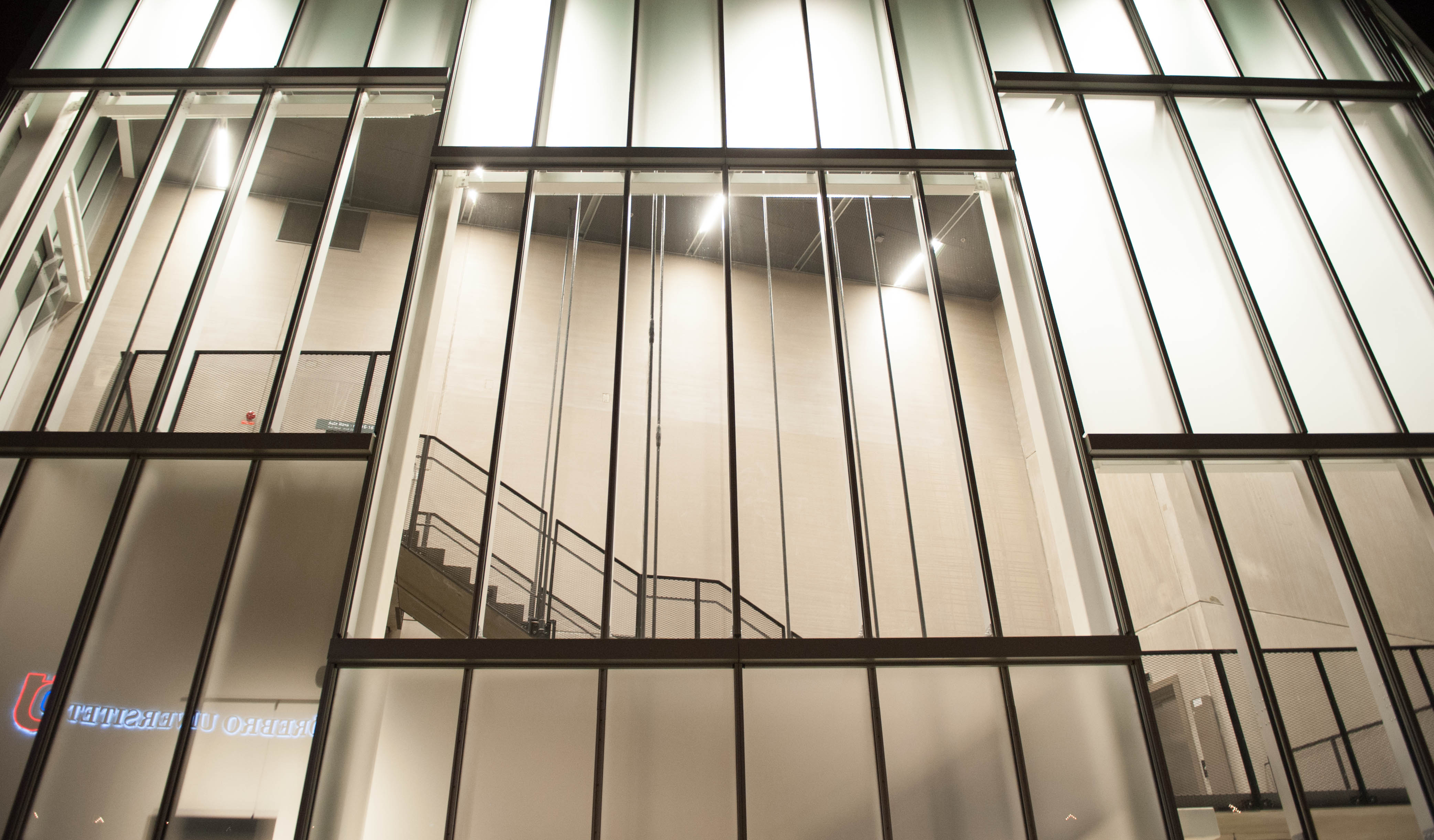
Nova Building at night

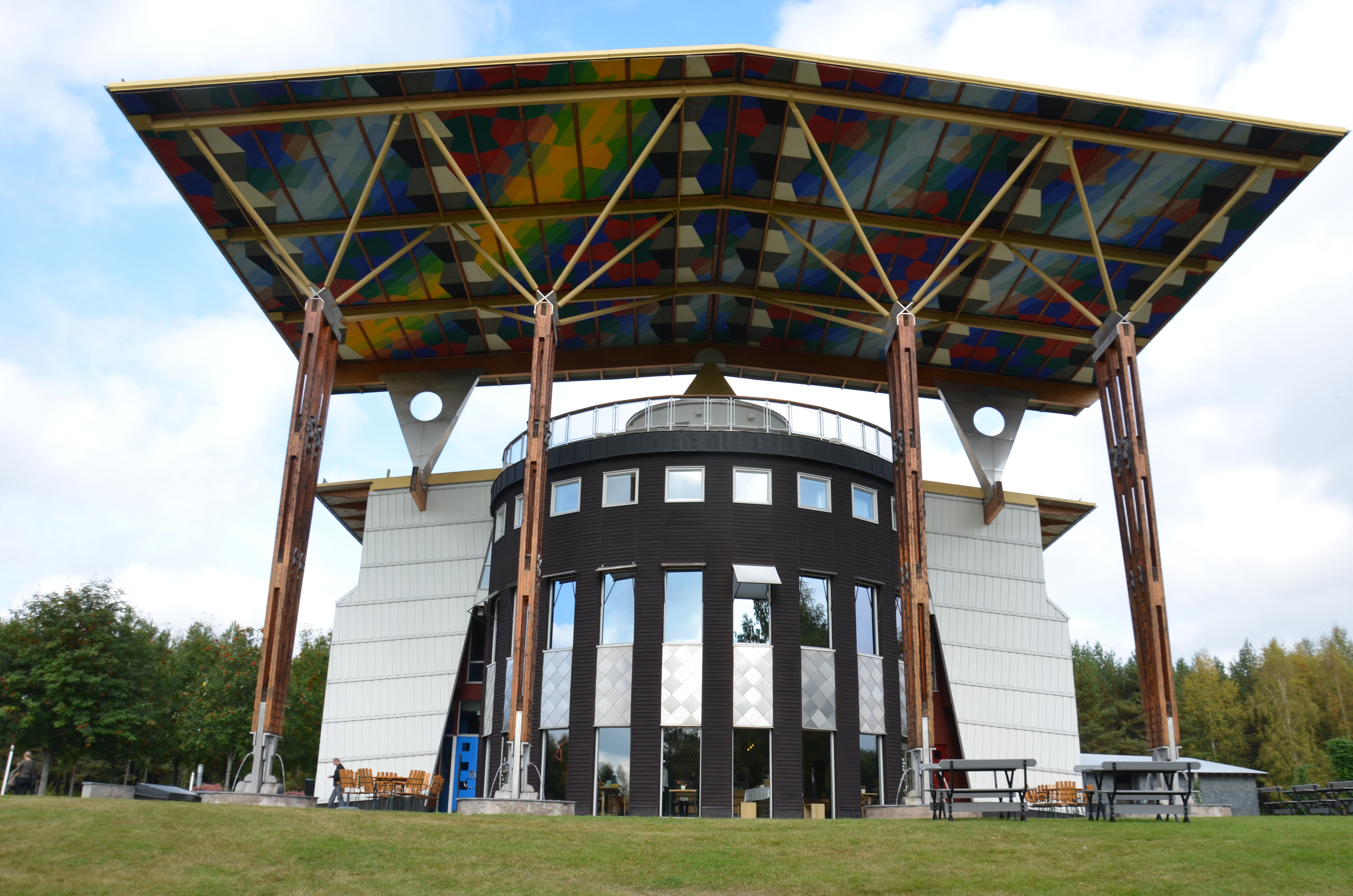
Campus Grythyttan

== See also ==
- Category:Örebro University alumni
