= 2011 in architecture =

The year 2011 in architecture involved some significant architectural events and new buildings.

== Events ==
- February 6 – Cambodian officials claim that "a wing" of Preah Vihear (11th-century Hindu temple) has collapsed due to an alleged Thai bombardment in the 2008–2013 Cambodian–Thai border crisis.
- May – Broadcaster BBC North begins its move into Bridge House, Dock House and Quay House, designed by Wilkinson Eyre, at MediaCityUK, Salford Quays, England.
- June 15 – St Paul's Cathedral in London completes its 15-year £40 million restoration project of cleaning and repair, among the largest such projects ever undertaken in the United Kingdom.
- November – The fourth World Architecture Festival is held in Barcelona.
- November 3–11 – Typhoon Haiyan causes widespread destruction in Southeast Asia. Among buildings seriously damaged is Guiuan Church in the Philippines.

== Buildings and structures ==
=== Buildings opened ===
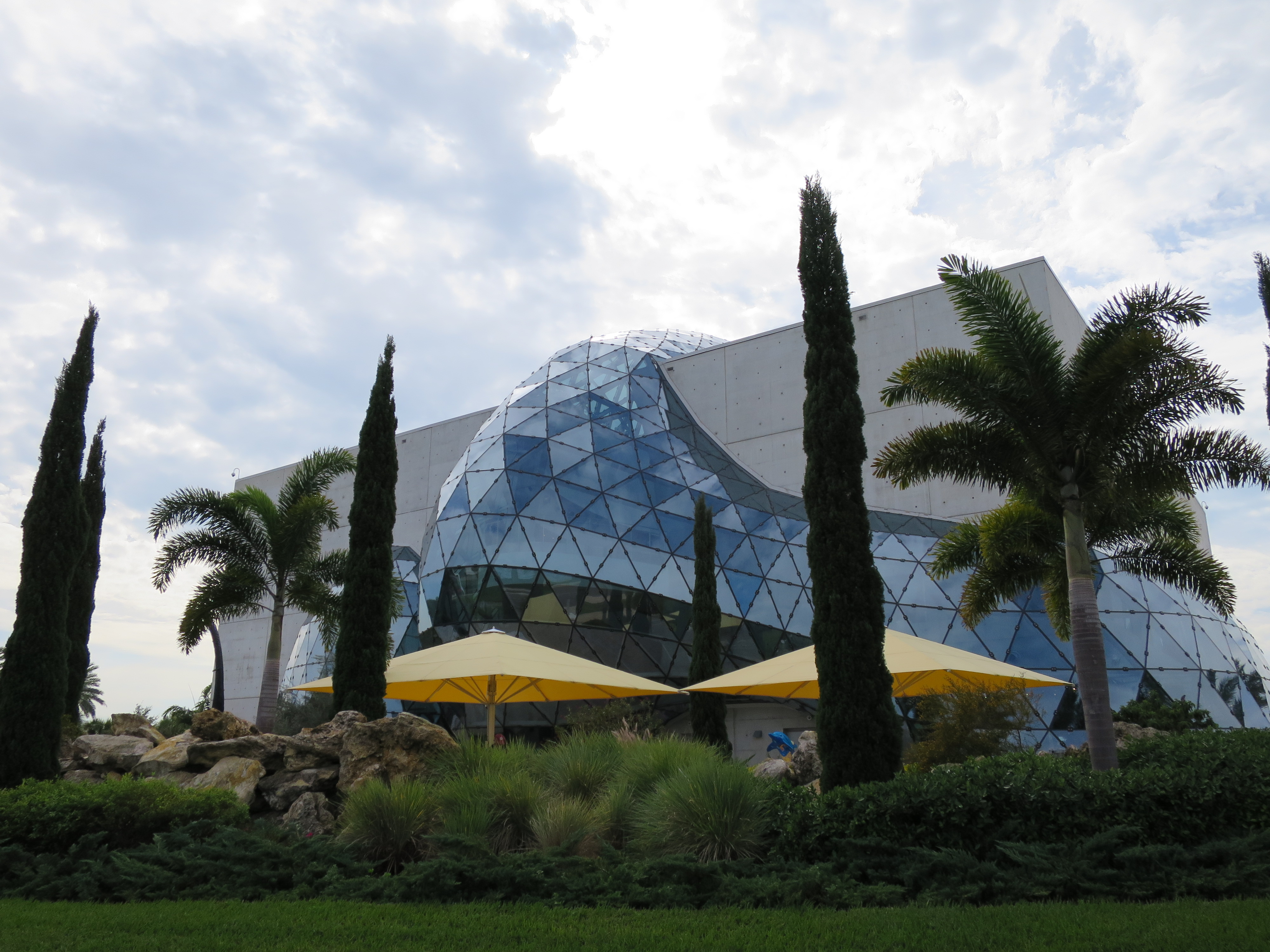
Salvador Dalí Museum, St. Petersburg, Florida, United States

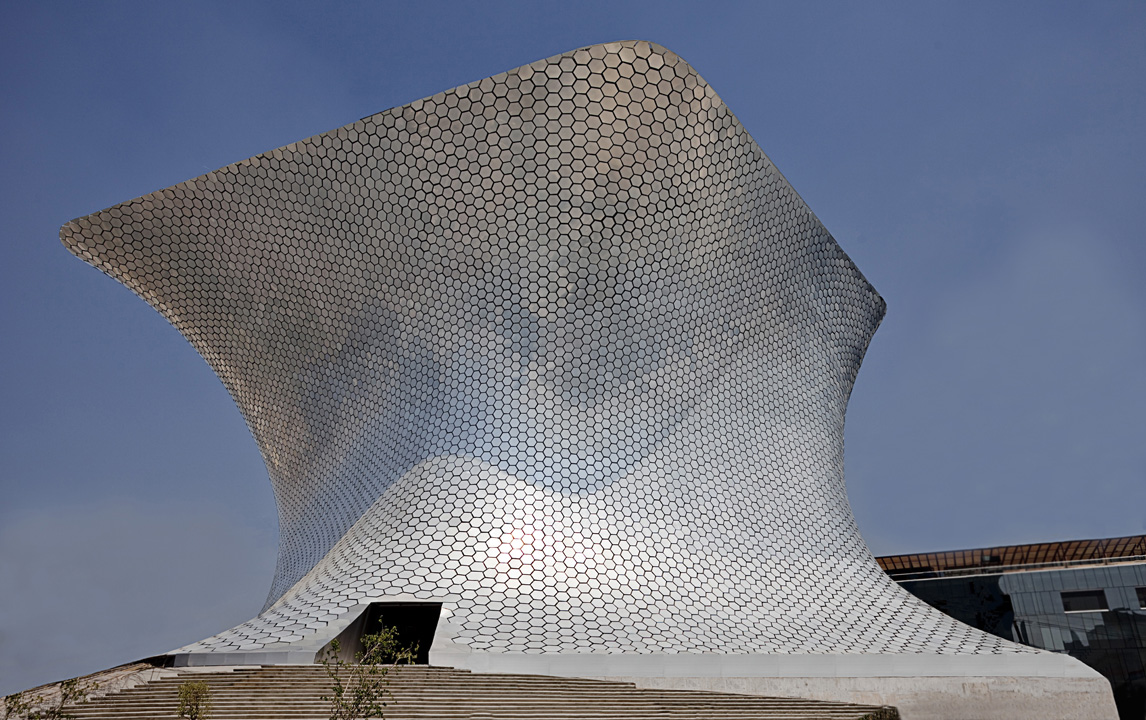
Museo Soumaya in Mexico City, Mexico

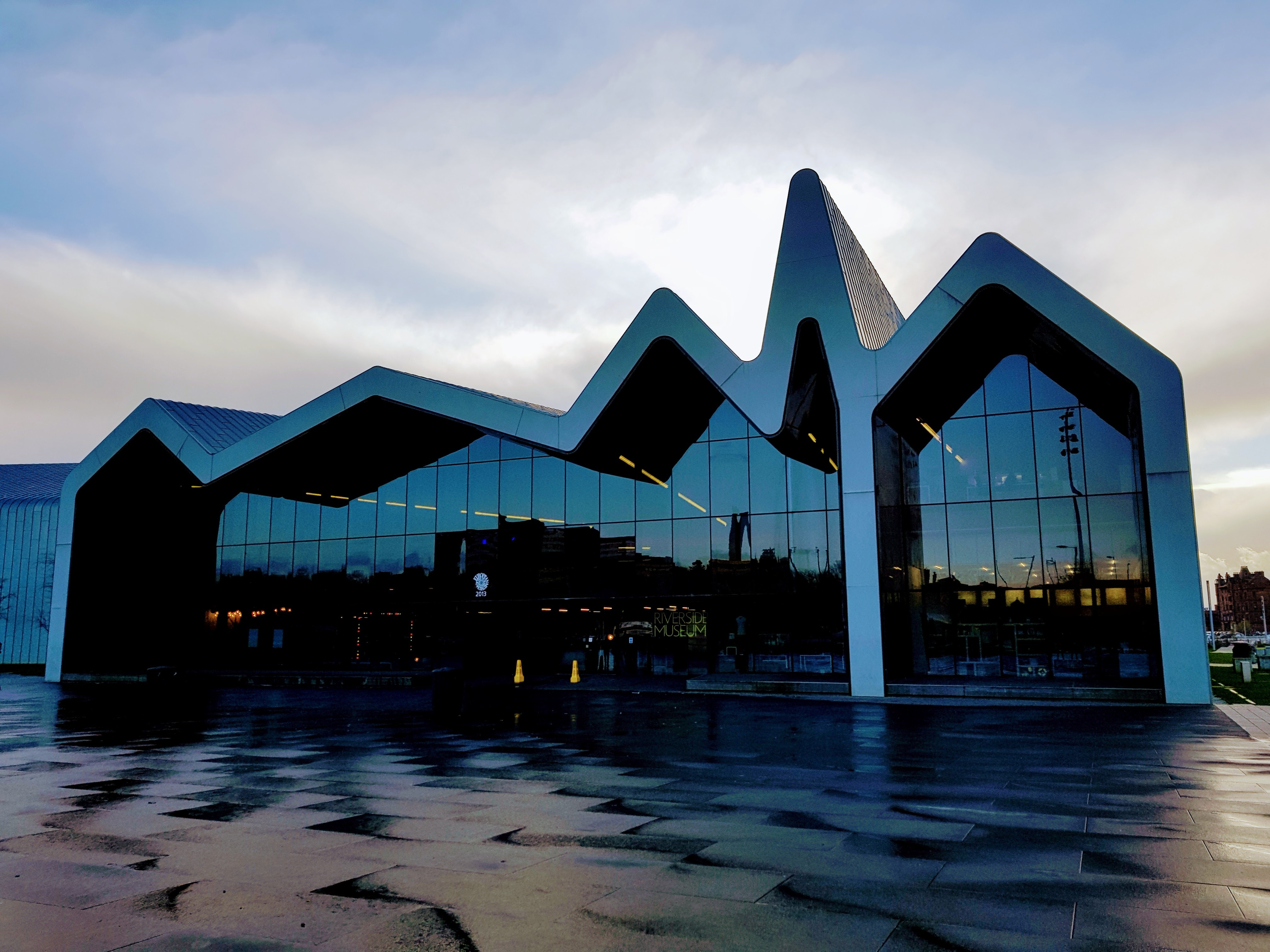
Riverside Museum in Glasgow, Scotland

- January 11 – Salvador Dalí Museum, St. Petersburg, Florida, United States, designed by HOK.
- January 21 – Museum of Old and New Art, on the Berriedale peninsula in Hobart, Tasmania, Australia, designed by Nonda Katsalidis.
- January 25 – New World Center, home of the New World Symphony Orchestra, at Miami Beach, Florida, designed by Frank Gehry.
- February 10 — The Granoff Center for the Creative Arts at Brown University, designed by Diller Scofidio + Renfro
- February 28 – Museo Soumaya in Mexico City, designed by Fernando Romero.
- March 1 – Media City Footbridge across the Manchester Ship Canal at MediaCityUK, Salford Quays, England, designed by Gifford and Wilkinson Eyre Architects.
- April 16 – Turner Contemporary art gallery, in Margate, Kent, England, designed by David Chipperfield.
- May 1 – New Lyric Theatre, Belfast, designed by O'Donnell & Tuomey of Dublin.
- May 21 – The Hepworth Wakefield art gallery, West Yorkshire, England, designed by David Chipperfield.
- May 31 – Ponte della Musica-Armando Trovajoli across the Tiber in Rome, Italy, designed by BuroHappold Engineering and Powell-Williams Architects.
- June – Windmill Hill archive centre, Waddesdon, England, designed by Stephen Marshall.
- June 16 – Gothenburg Mosque, Sweden.
- June 20 – Riverside Museum, the new development of the Glasgow Museum of Transport in Scotland, designed by Zaha Hadid Architects.
- June 25 – Peace Bridge across the River Foyle in Derry, Northern Ireland, designed by Wilkinson Eyre Architects.
- July 19 – New Museum of Liverpool, at Liverpool Pier Head, England, designed by architects 3XN and engineers Buro Happold.
- August 27 – Rustavi Sioni, church in Rustavi, Georgia, designed by Besarion Menabde, Nikoloz Abashidze and Nikolos Dadiani (consecration date).
- September – firstsite new art gallery, Colchester, England, designed by Rafael Viñoly.
- September 11 – National September 11 Memorial, Reflecting Absence, on the World Trade Center site in New York City, USA, designed by architect Michael Arad with landscape architect Peter Walker (dedication date).
- September 13 – Westfield Stratford City shopping mall, Stratford, London.
- October 12 – Royal Opera House Muscat opens in Muscat, Oman.
- October 20 — The Human Ecology Building at Cornell University is dedicated. Designed by Gruzen-Samton Architects (IBI Group).
- December 21 – Capital Gate skyscraper hotel and office building, in Abu Dhabi.

=== Buildings completed ===
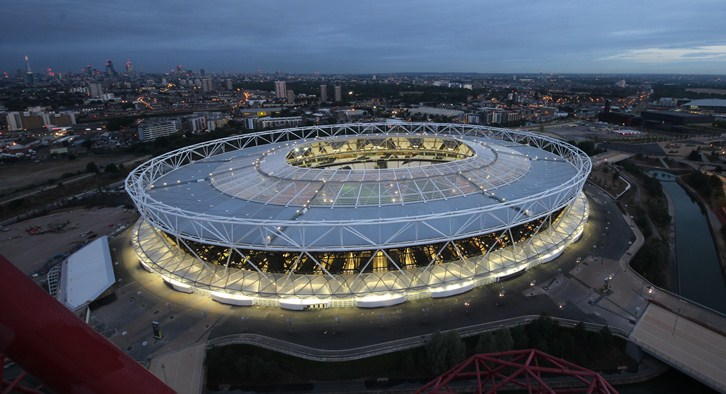
Olympic Stadium (London), England

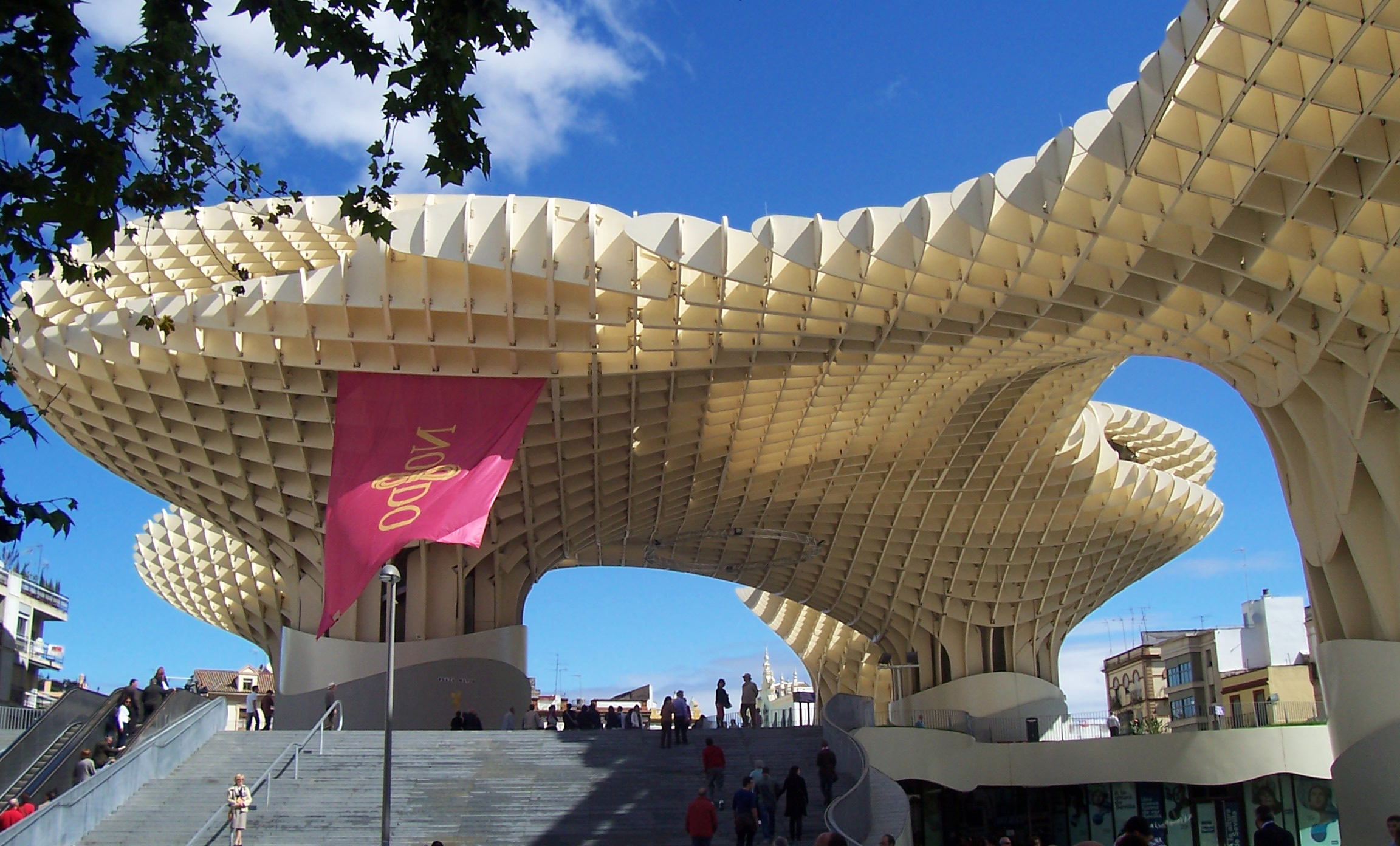
Metropol Parasol in Seville, Spain

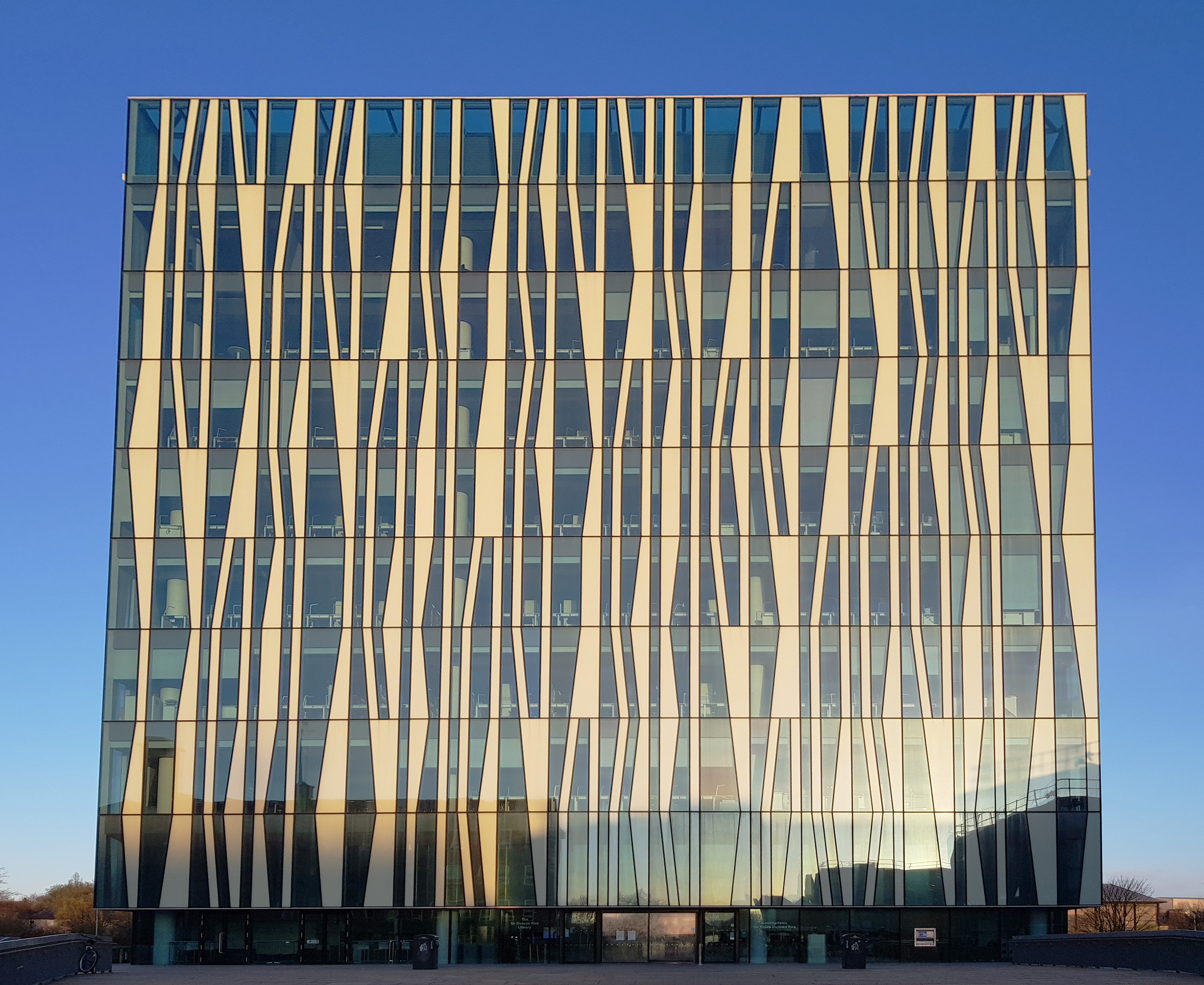
Aberdeen University New Library in Scotland

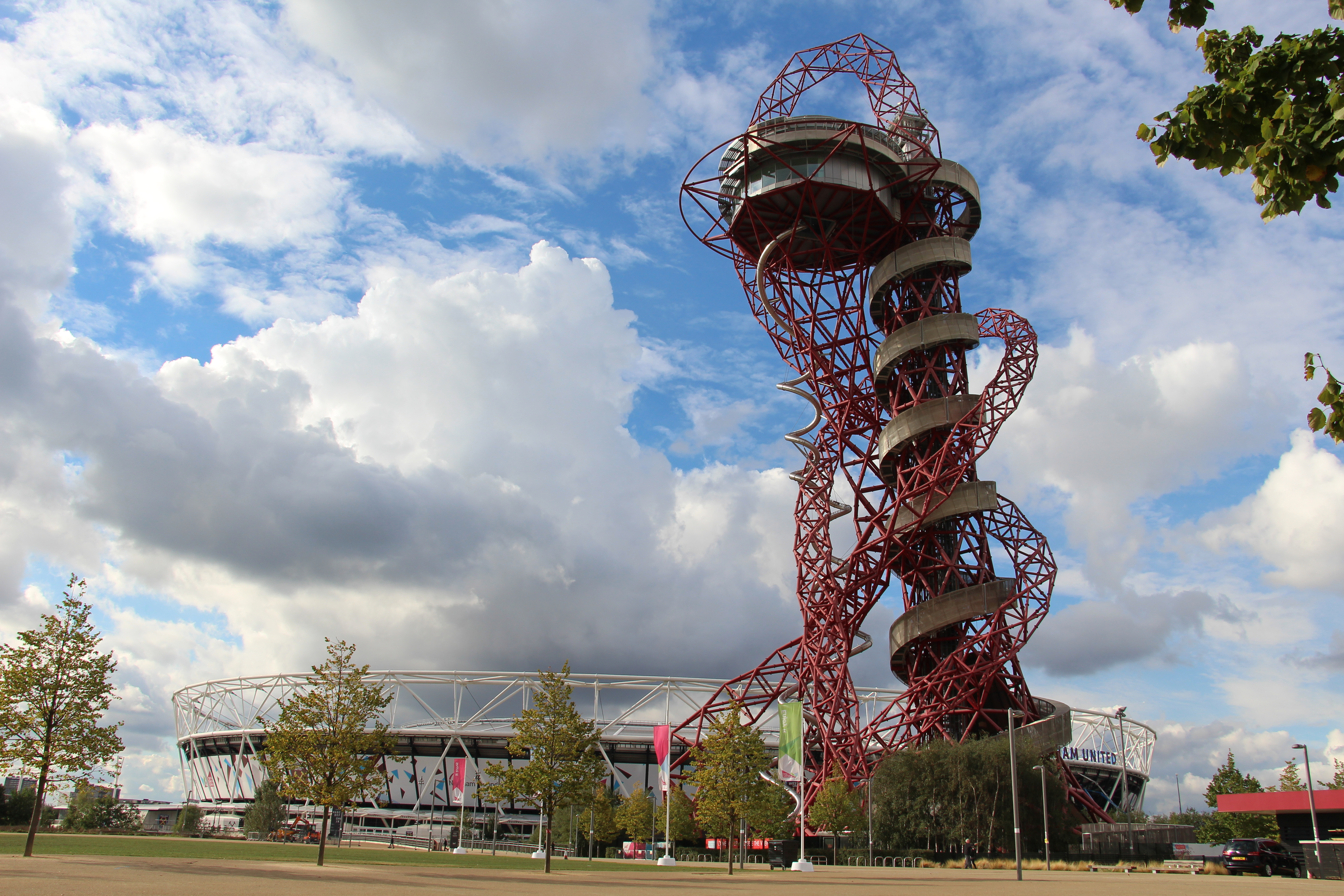
ArcelorMittal Orbit at Olympic Park, London, England

- January
  - City of Westminster College, Paddington Green Campus, London, designed by schmidt hammer lassen architects.
  - Heron Tower in the City of London, designed by Kohn Pedersen Fox.
- February
  - 8 Spruce Street, a skyscraper in New York City, USA, designed by Frank Gehry.
  - Sunset Chapel, Acapulco, Guerrero, Mexico, designed by BNKR Arquitectura.
- March 29 – London Olympic Stadium, designed by Populous.
- April – Metropol Parasol in Seville, Spain, designed by Jürgen Mayer.
- July 6 – Trump Ocean Club International Hotel and Tower, the tallest building in Panama and Latin America.
- July 27 – London Aquatics Centre, designed by Zaha Hadid.
- September
  - CMA CGM Tower in Marseille, designed by Zaha Hadid.
  - Aberdeen University New Library in Scotland, designed by Schmidt Hammer Lassen architects.
- October 20 — Milstein Hall at Cornell University, designed by Rem Koolhaas
- October 28 – ArcelorMittal Orbit, designed by Anish Kapoor with Cecil Balmond, erected at Olympic Park, London.
- November
  - Canada Water Library in London Docklands, designed by Piers Gough of CZWG.
  - Robert H. Jackson United States Courthouse in Buffalo, New York, designed by Kohn Pedersen Fox.
- dates unknown
  - N M Rothschild & Sons' New Court banking headquarters in the City of London, designed by Rem Koolhaas's OMA, completed.
  - Brockholes Visitor Centre, a floating wooden nature reserve centre designed by Adam Khan of Arca, opens near Preston, Lancashire, England.
  - Eighth Avenue Place East in Calgary, Alberta
  - Maggie's Centres, drop-in cancer care centres in Great Britain
    - Maggie's Gartnavel, Glasgow, designed by Rem Koolhaas's OMA.
    - Maggie's Nottingham, designed by Piers Gough and Paul Smith.
    - Maggie's South West Wales, Swansea, designed by Kisho Kurokawa (opens December 9).
  - Temporary Serpentine Pavilion in London, designed by Peter Zumthor.
  - Folly for a Flyover, a 'pop-up' temporary arts centre in East London, England, designed by Assemble.
  - New Hospital Pavilion, University of Chicago Medical Center, designed by Rafael Viñoly, projected for completion.
  - University of Arizona Science Center, Tucson, designed by Rafael Viñoly, projected for completion.
  - The Crystal, Copenhagen, Denmark (part of Nykredit headquarters), designed by Schmidt Hammer Lassen Architects.
  - Kravis Center, Claremont McKenna College, Claremont, California, designed by Rafael Viñoly, projected for completion.

== Awards ==
- AIA Gold Medal – Fumihiko Maki
- Architecture Firm Award – BNIM Architects
- Carbuncle Cup – MediaCityUK
- Driehaus Architecture Prize for New Classical Architecture – Robert A. M. Stern
- Emporis Skyscraper Award – 8 Spruce Street New York City designed by Frank Gehry
- European Union Prize for Contemporary Architecture (Mies van der Rohe Prize) – David Chipperfield
- Grand Prix de l'urbanisme – Michel Desvigne
- Lawrence Israel Prize – David Rockwell
- LEAF Award, Overall Winner – OBR Open Building Research
- Praemium Imperiale Architecture Award – Ricardo Legorreta
- Pritzker Architecture Prize – Eduardo Souto de Moura
- RAIA Gold Medal – Graeme Gunn
- RIBA Royal Gold Medal – David Chipperfield
- Stirling Prize – Zaha Hadid for Evelyn Grace Academy
- Thomas Jefferson Medal in Architecture – Maya Lin
- International Union of Architects UIA Gold Medal – Álvaro Siza Vieira
- AIA Twenty-five Year Award – John Hancock Tower designed by Pei Cobb Freed & Partners
- UIA Gold Medal – Álvaro Siza Vieira
- Vincent Scully Prize – William K. Reilly

== Deaths ==
- June 6
  - Stefan Kuryłowicz, Polish architect (born 1949)
  - Amnon Niv, Israeli architect and urban designer (born 1930)
- September 17 – Colin Madigan, Australian architect (born 1921)
- September 27 – Imre Makovecz, Hungarian architect (born 1935)
- October 2 – Efraín Recinos, Guatemalan architect (born 1928)
- October 5 – Enver Faja, Albanian architect (born 1934)
- October 24 – Bruno Weber, Swiss architect (born 1931)
- November 25 – Karel Hubacek, Czech architect (born 1924)
- December 12 – Gene Summers, American architect (born 1928)
- December 26 – Kiyonori Kikutake, Japanese architect, co-founder of the Metabolist group. (born 1928)
- December 27 – Anne Tyng, American architect (born 1920)
- December 30 – Ricardo Legorreta, Mexican architect, UIA Gold Medalist (born 1931)

== See also ==
- Timeline of architecture
