= IGZ =

IGZ may refer to:

- IGZ, abbreviation for Inspectie voor de Gezondheidszorg, Dutch name for the Dutch Health Care Inspectorate
- IGZ, abbreviation for the Leibniz Institute of Vegetable and Ornamental Crops, a section of the Leibniz Association, Germany
- IGZ, abbreviation for Innovation and Business Incubation Centre, organisation of Adlershof, Germany
- IGZ, German building architected by Jürgen Mayer
- IGZ, abbreviation for Innovations- und Gründerzentrum Nürnberg-Fürth-Erlangen GmbH, organisation founded in Erlangen, Germany
