= Rustavi Sioni =

21st-century Georgian church

Coordinates: 41.5633°N 44.9820°E

The Rustavi church of the Assumption of Mary (Georgian: ყოვლადწმინდა ღვთისმშობლის მიძინების სახელობის ტაძარი) better known as Rustavi Sioni (Georgian: რუსთავის სიონი) is a Georgian Orthodox church in Rustavi, Georgia. It was built in 2000–2011. The project was created by Besarion Menabde, Nikoloz Abashidze and Nikolos Dadiani. The building works were led by Temur Burkiashvili.

The Rustavi Sioni church was consecrated on 27 August 2011 by Ioane, the Archbishop of Rustavi and Marneuli. On the following day, 28 August, on the day of Assumption of Georgian Orthodox Church, the first liturgy was conducted in Rustavi Sioni Church.
