= Sunset Chapel =

Chapel in Acapulco, Mexico

Location
- Location: Acapulco, Guerrero, México
- Interactive map of Sunset Chapel

Architecture
- Architect: Esteban Suarez
- Completed: February 2011
- Capacity: 120 square metres (1,300 sq ft)

Website
- BNKR Arquitectura

The Sunset Chapel is a private chapel in Acapulco, Guerrero, Mexico designed by BNKR Arquitectura.

== Awards and publication ==
- CEMEX Building Awards 2011, Nominado, Sunset Chapel, Monterrey, México.
- World Architecture Festival 2011, Nominated, Sunset Chapel. Category “Civic and Community Buildings”, Barcelona, Spain.
