= Metropol Parasol =

Wooden structure in Seville, Spain

Coordinates: 37°23′35.71″N 5°59′30.77″W

Setas de Sevilla
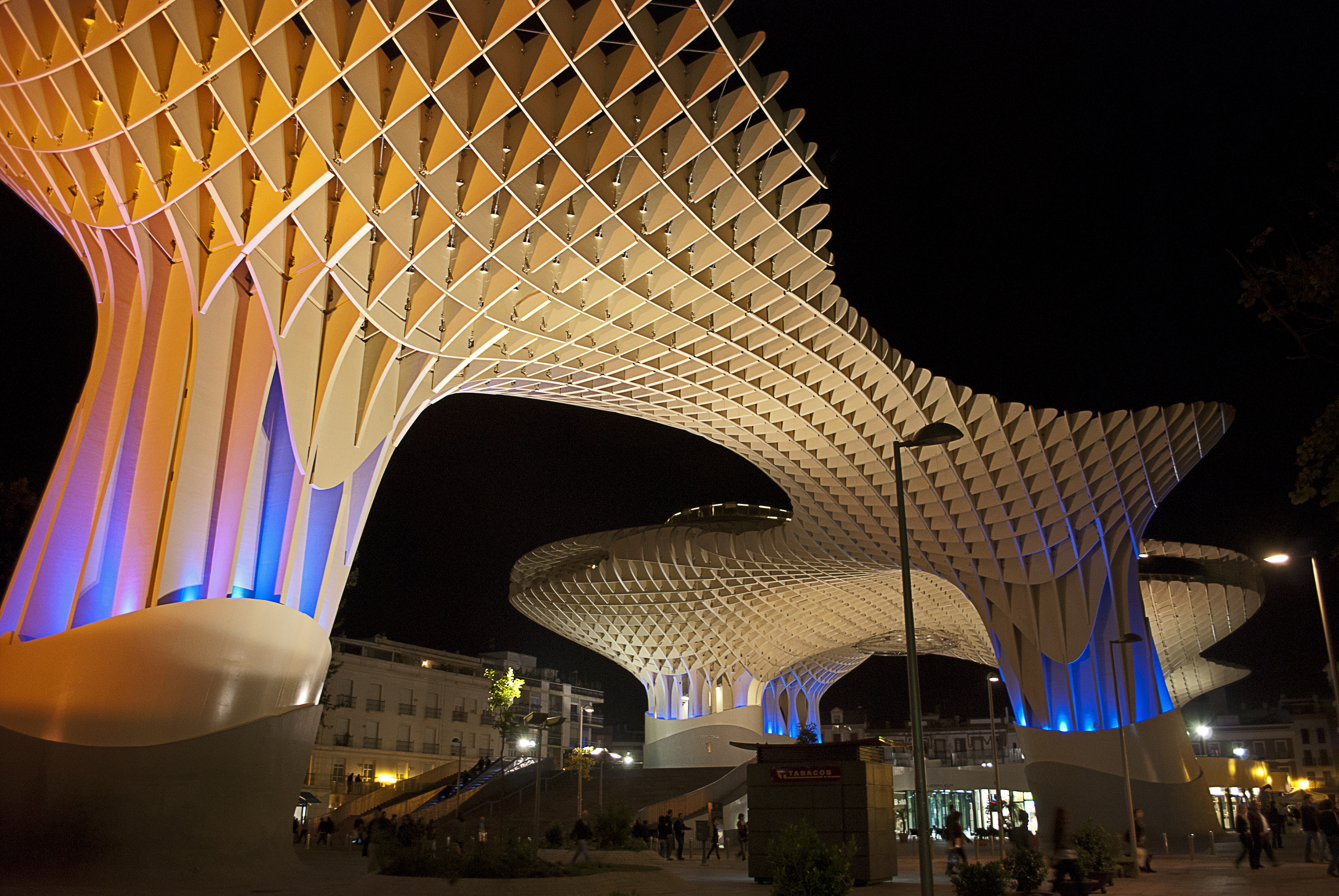
- Interactive map of the Setas de Sevilla area

General information
- Location: Seville, Spain
- Construction started: 2005
- Completed: 2011
- Operator: Sacyr

Design and construction
- Architect: Jürgen Mayer H.
- Engineer: Arup
- Main contractor: Sacyr

The Setas de Sevilla ("Mushrooms of Seville") or Las Setas ("The Mushrooms"), initially titled Metropol Parasol, is a large, predominantly wood structure located at La Encarnación square in the old quarter of Seville, Spain. It accommodates a traditional market, restaurants, a performance square, archaeological museum, a venue for MICE events Metropol Eventos — and 'rooftop' terrace with a panoramic view of Seville's old city.

Selected from 65 submissions in a city-sponsored competition, the structure was designed by German architect Jürgen Mayer, was completed in April 2011, and is roughly 150 by 70 metres (490 by 230 ft) with an approximate height of 26 metres (85 ft).

Initially beset with technical problems as well as budget and schedule overruns, the parasols are constructed of 3,500 cubic meters of micro-laminated Finnish pine and are marketed as the world's largest wooden structure.

Since their opening, the parasols have become Seville's third-most visited urban landmark.

== Name ==
During development, the project was titled Metropol Parasol, with locals quickly adopting a colloquial nickname, the setas or mushrooms. Seville officially adopted the name Setas de Sevilla after discovering the project's architect had trademarked the name "Metropol Parasol" and would charge for its use; Setas de Sevilla has been the project's official name since opening.

== Design ==
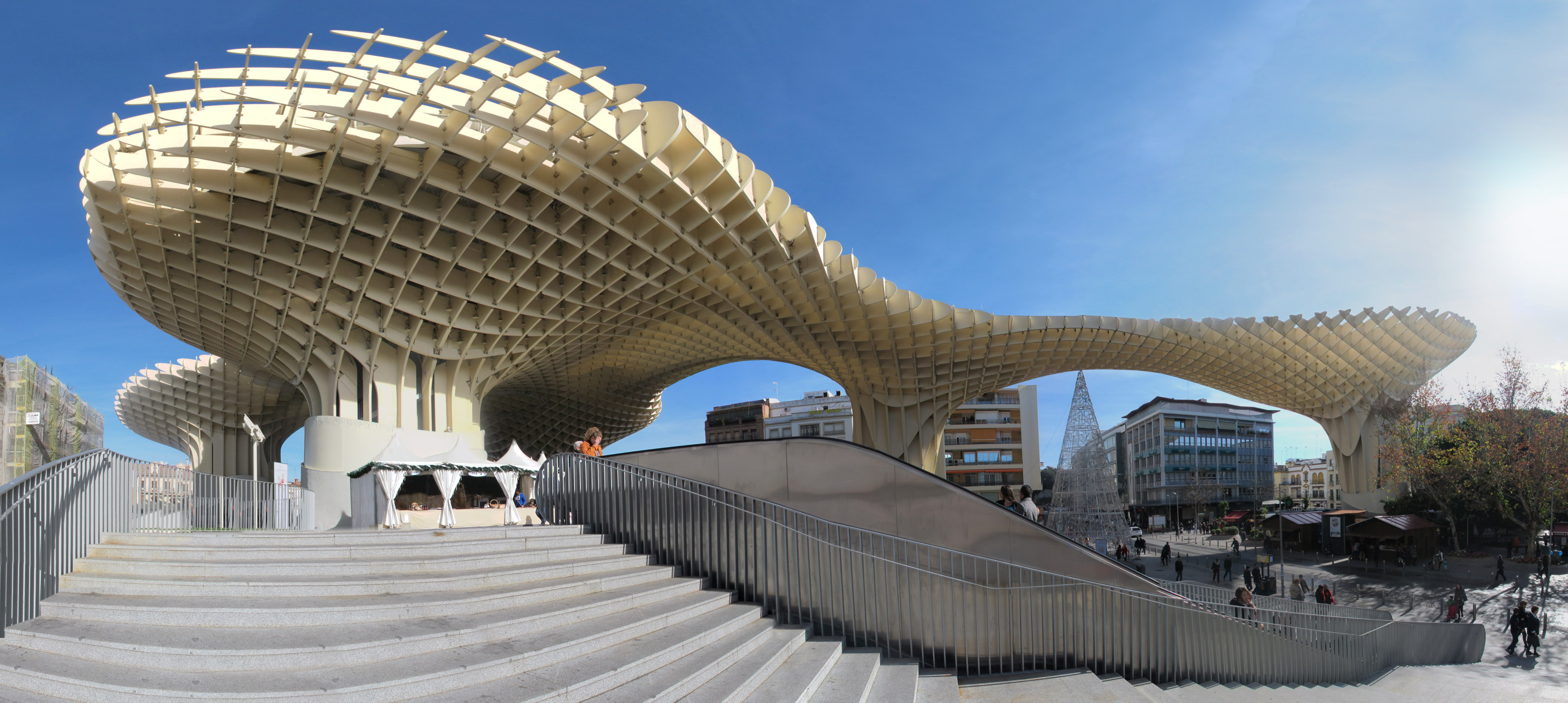
Panorama

The structure consists of six parasols loosely resembling large mushrooms, inspired by the vaults of the Cathedral of Seville and the ficus trees in the nearby Plaza de Cristo de Burgos. The Setas are organized in four levels. The underground level (Level 0) accommodates the Antiquarium, where Roman and Moorish remains discovered on site are displayed in a museum. Level 1 (street level) is the Central Market. The roof of Level 1 is the surface of the open-air public plaza, shaded by the wooden parasols above and designed for public events. Levels 2 and 3 are the two stages of the panoramic terraces (including a restaurant), offering a view of the city centre.

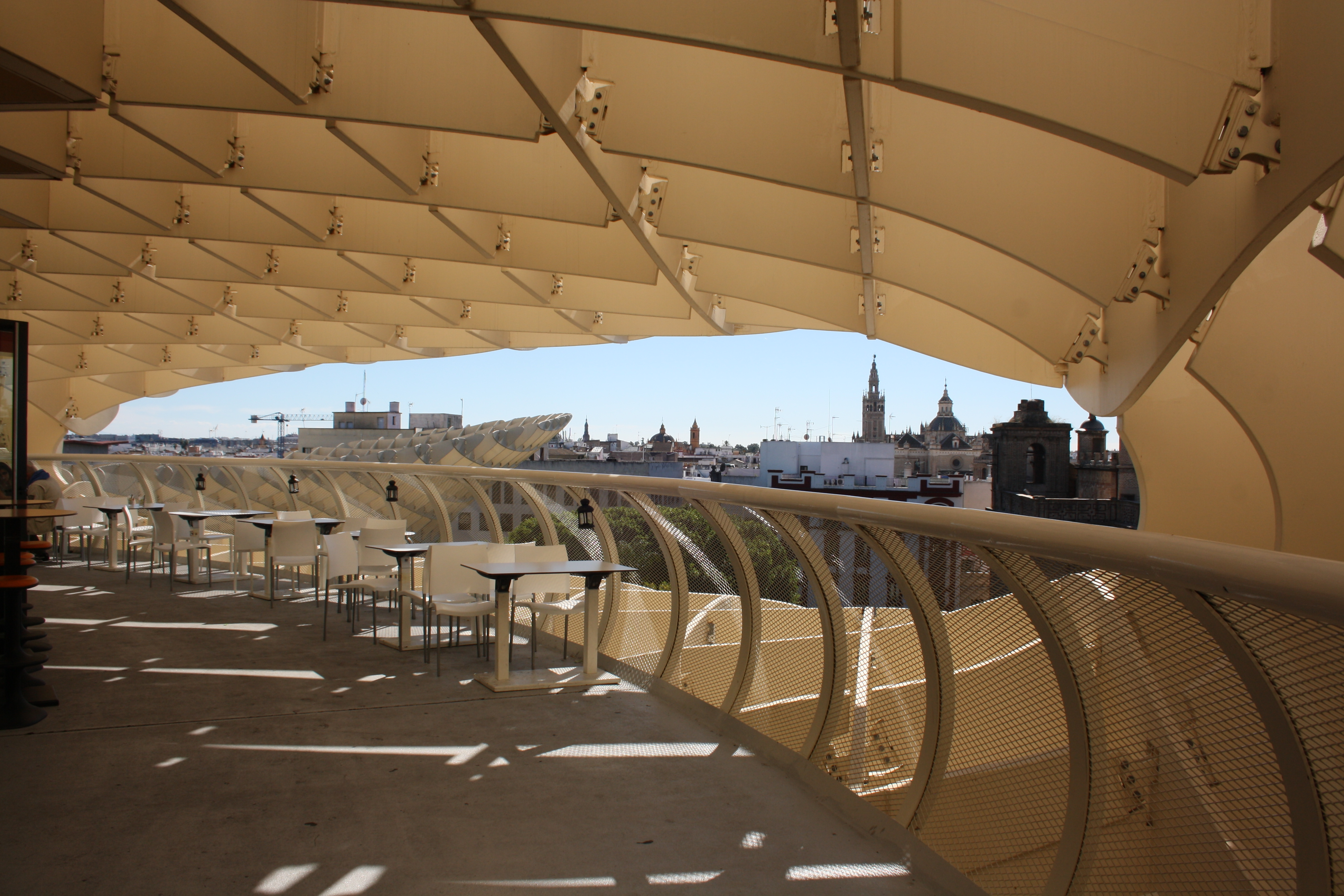
A restaurant at the Setas

== Background ==
From the 19th century a dedicated market building was located in the plaza, which was partially demolished in 1948 in accordance with urban renewal plans. The market itself remained until 1973, when the remainder of the dilapidated market building was finally demolished. The land remained undeveloped until 1990, when the city planned to construct a market with underground parking. During construction, ruins dating to the Roman and Al-Andalus eras were discovered, and construction was frozen after an expenditure of 14 million euros. In 2004, the city opened an international competition to solicit bids to redevelop the area.

== Construction ==
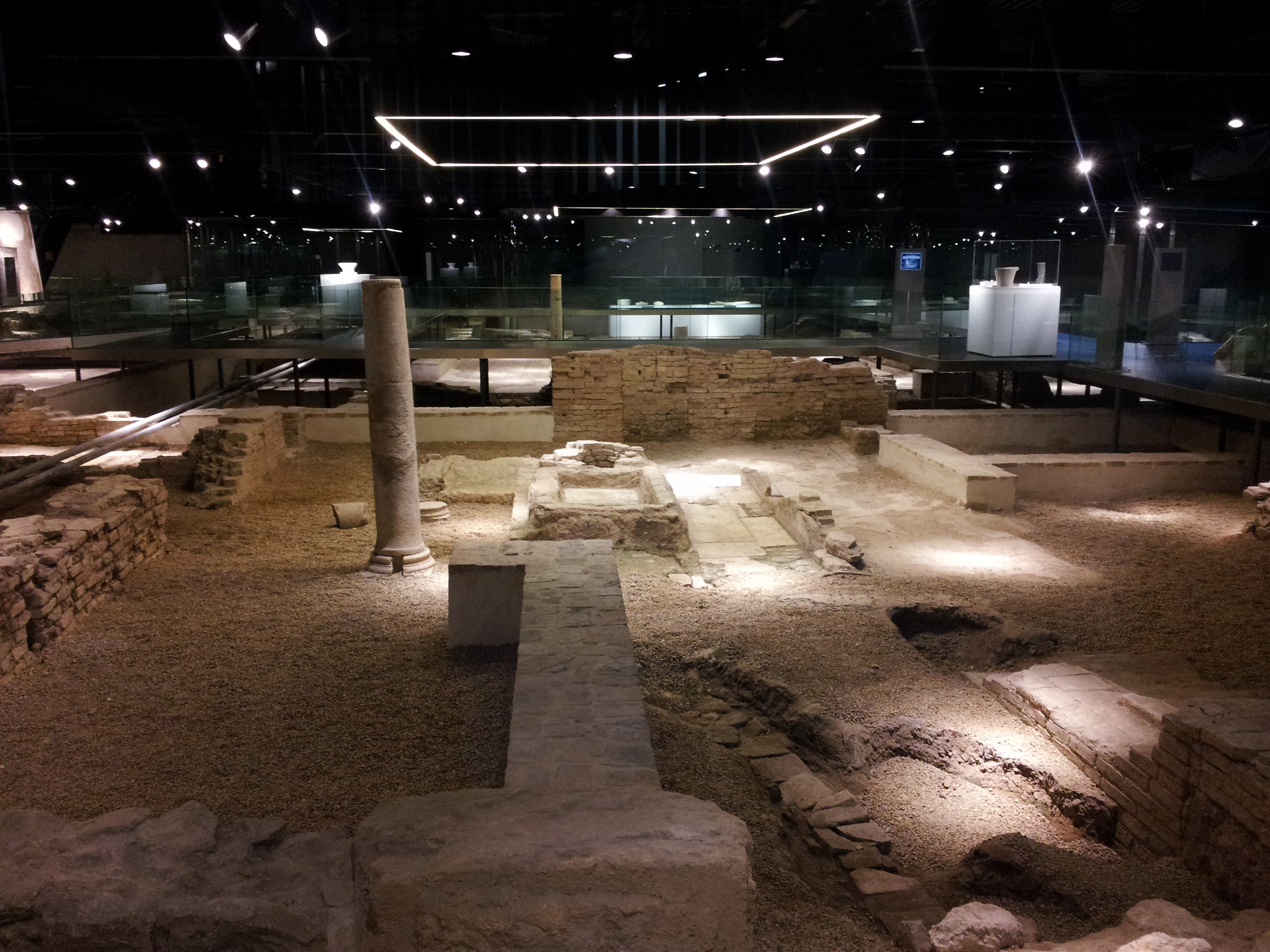
Antiquarium, under the Setas

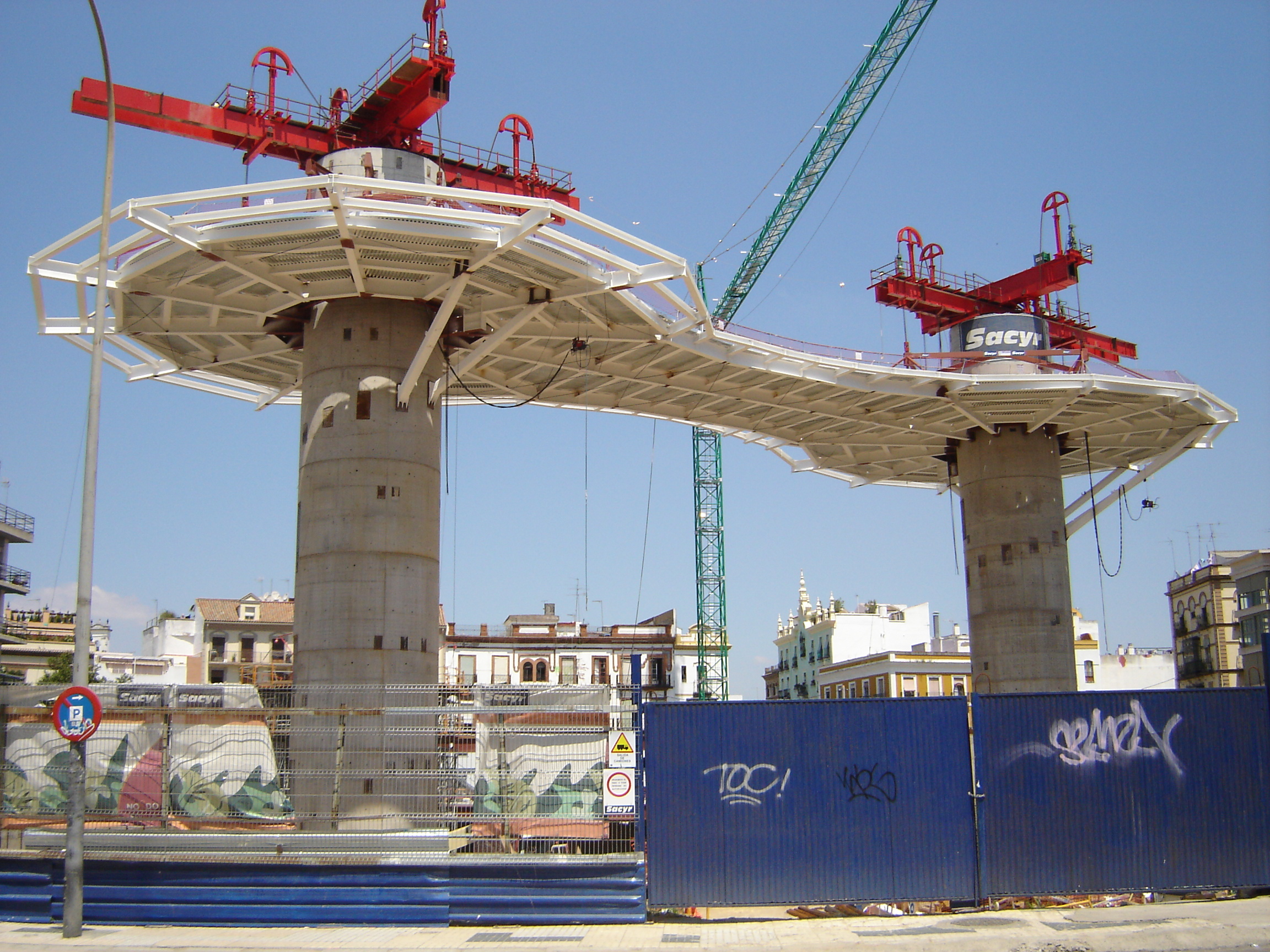
Under construction in 2007.

Construction began on June 26, 2005, with an estimated cost of 50 million euros and completion date of June 2007. By May 2007, engineering firm Arup informed municipal authorities the structure was technically unfeasible as designed, that a number of structural assumptions had not been tested and the design appeared to violate the limitations of known materials.

Alternatives to buttress the structure proved impractical because of their added weight, with a glued reinforcement resolution developed by early 2009 — with a revised cost of approximately 100 million euros.

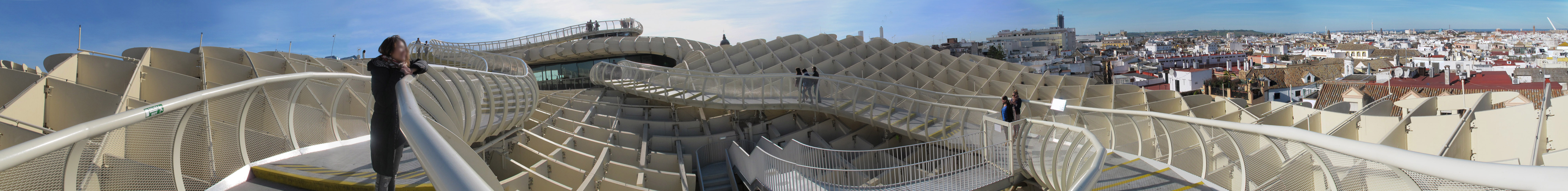
View from the upper level
