= Gene Summers (architect) =

American architect (1928–2011)

- Born: July 31, 1926; San Antonio, Texas, U.S.
- Died: December 12, 2011 (aged 85); Sebastopol, California, U.S.
- Occupation: Architect
- Era: 1950s–1960s
- Employer: Ludwig Mies van der Rohe
- Notable work: Seagram Building in Manhattan and other Modernist landmarks, McCormick Place convention center in Chicago
- Children: 4

Gene R. Summers (July 31, 1928 – December 12, 2011) was an American modernist architect. Considered to have been Mies van der Rohe's "right-hand man", he assisted his famed employer in the design of the iconic Seagram Building on Park Avenue on the island of Manhattan in New York City. Later, in private practice, he designed the huge McCormick Place convention center in Chicago, Illinois.

== Biography ==
Born in San Antonio, Texas, Summers studied architecture at Texas A&M, where he received his bachelor's degree, and at the Illinois Institute of Technology under Mies van der Rohe, where he received his master's degree in 1951.

From 1950 until 1966, Gene Summers served as project architect for Mies van der Rohe, working on important commissions such as the Seagram Building in New York City, the Toronto-Dominion Centre and the National Gallery in Berlin.

In 1967, he became partner in charge of design in the Chicago architectural firm of C. F. Murphy Associates, where he remained until 1973. His best-known project from that time, the McCormick Place convention center in Chicago, was completed in 1970.

From 1973 until 1985, Gene Summers, in association with Phyllis Lambert, worked as real estate developers in California where they restored, among other projects, several industrial parks, the Biltmore Hotel in Los Angeles, and the Newporter Resort Hotel in Newport Beach.

Gene Summers built up a wide collection of drawings by architects that he donated to the Canadian Centre for Architecture.

In 1985, Gene Summers moved to France, but returned to Chicago in 1989 to become dean of the College of Architecture at the Illinois Institute of Technology, a position he held until 1993. While dean of the IIT, he also served as the campus architect. He led the construction of the OMA McCormick Tribune Campus Center, of the Graham Resource Center, and the renovation of the S. R. Crown Hall built by his mentor Mies.

== Awards ==
- 1972: Elected to the College of Fellows of the American Institute of Architects.
