= Enver Faja =

Albanian architect and diplomat

Enver Faja (April 6, 1934 – September 29, 2011) was an Albanian architect and diplomat. Faja served as the Ambassador of Albania to Poland from 1992 to 1996.

Artan Shkrell, the head of Albania's Architects Association, called Faja, whose career spanned more than fifty years, "one of the main figures of the Albanian architecture." Faja's design portfolio included the National Historical Museum, master plan of Student's Town in Tirana, and the University of Tirana's Faculty of Science building.

Enver Faja died from a long illness on September, 2011, in Strasbourg, France, at the age of 77. His funeral was held at the National Gallery of Arts in Tirana.
