= Jürgen Mayer =

German architect (born 1965)

- Born: 1965 (age 60–61); Stuttgart, West Germany
- Occupation: Architect
- Buildings: Metropol Parasol in Sevilla, Spain & New Airport Building in Mestia, Georgia

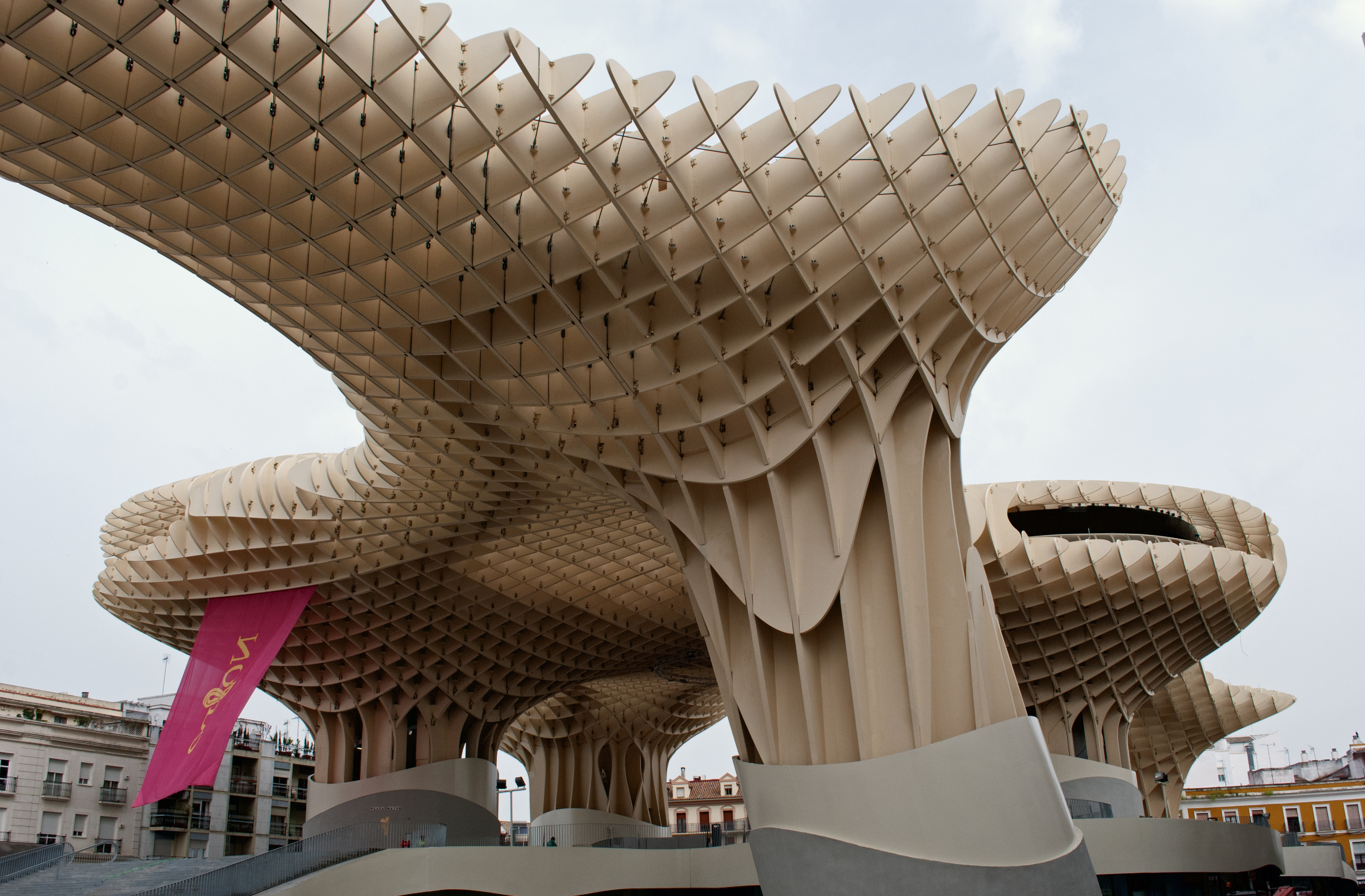
Metropol Parasol in Seville, Spain.

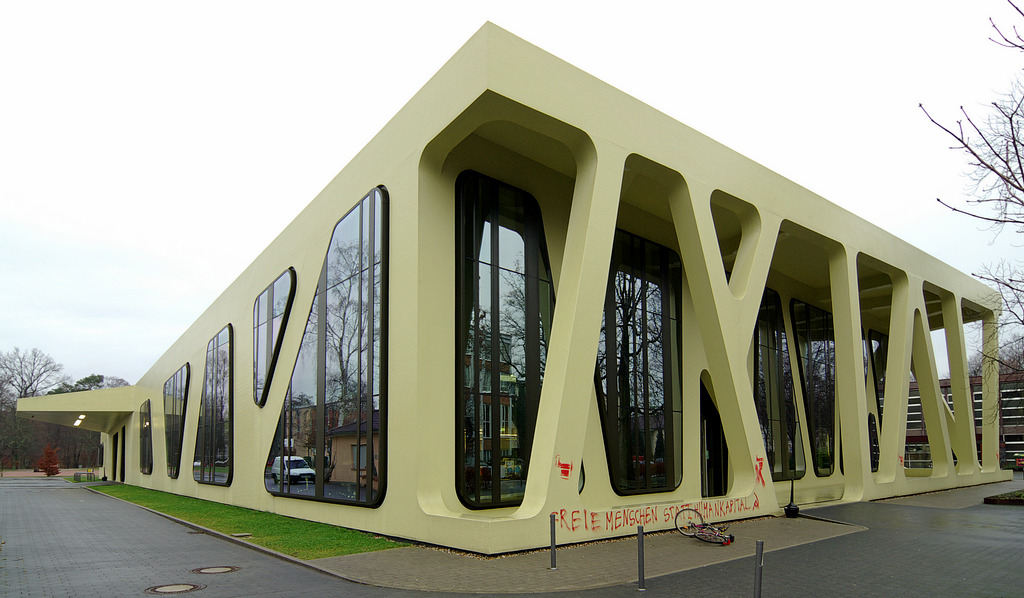
Mensa Moltke in Karlsruhe, Germany.

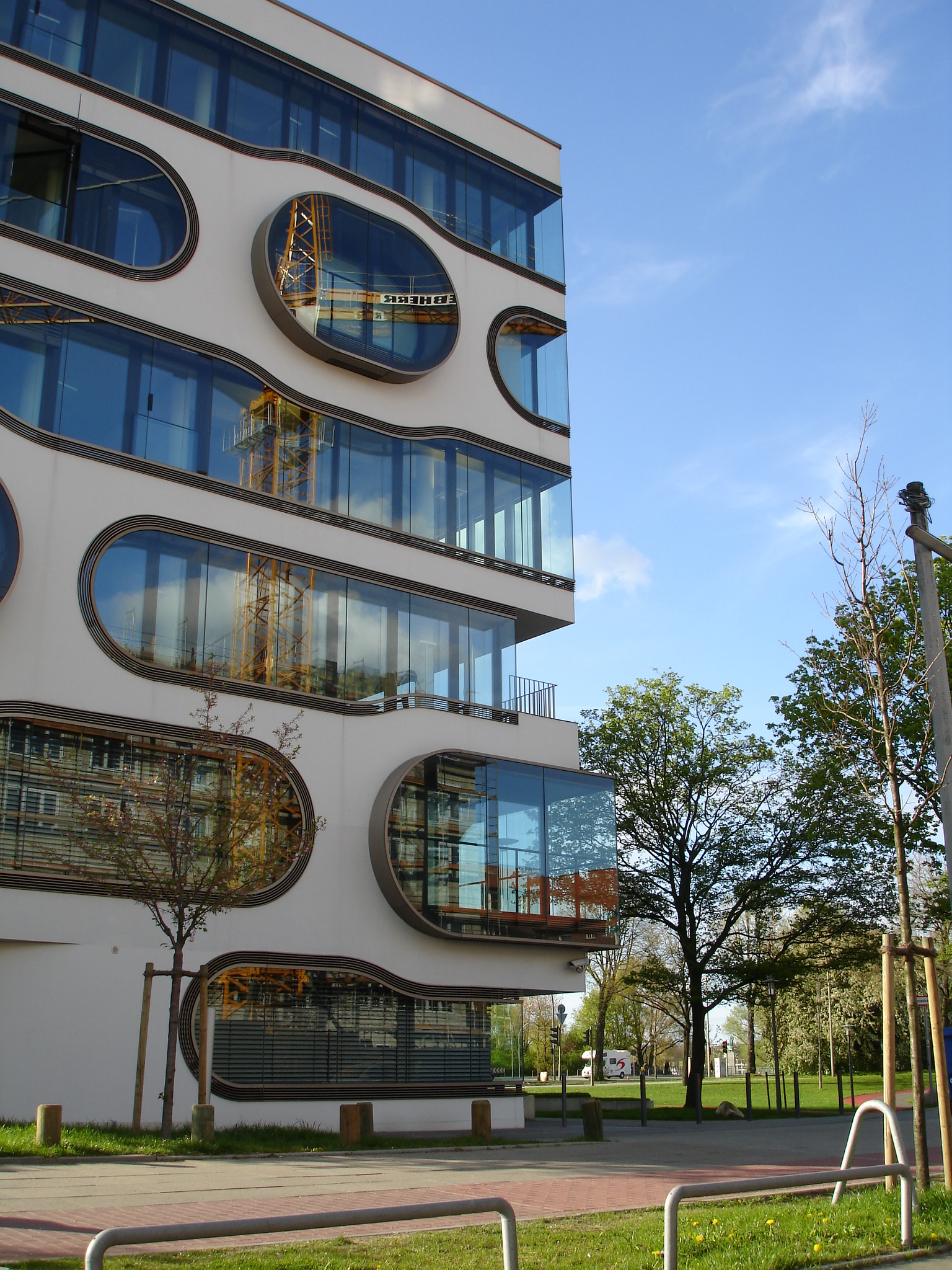
Office building ADA1 in Hamburg, Germany.

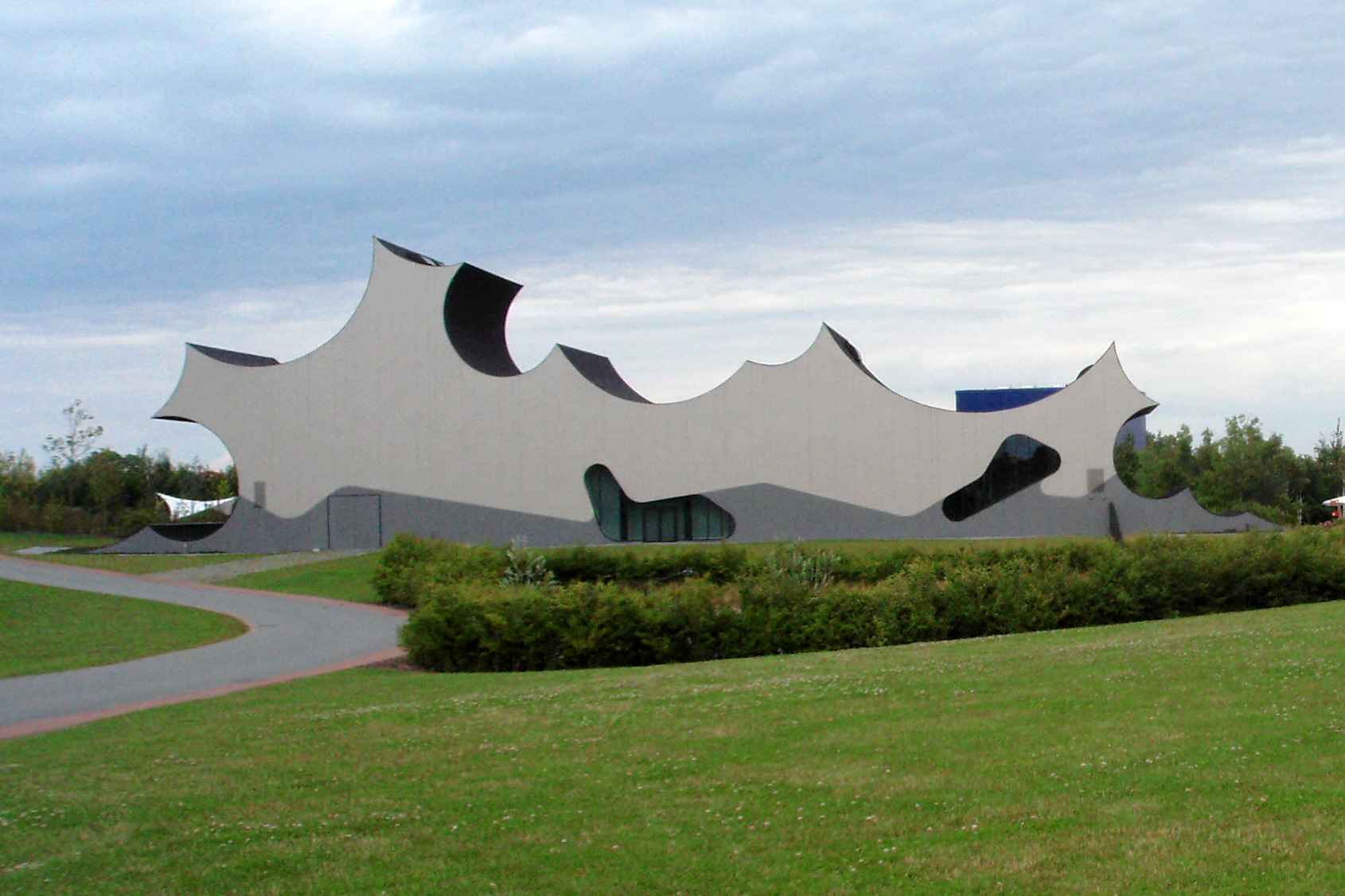
Danfoss Universe in Nordborg, Denmark.

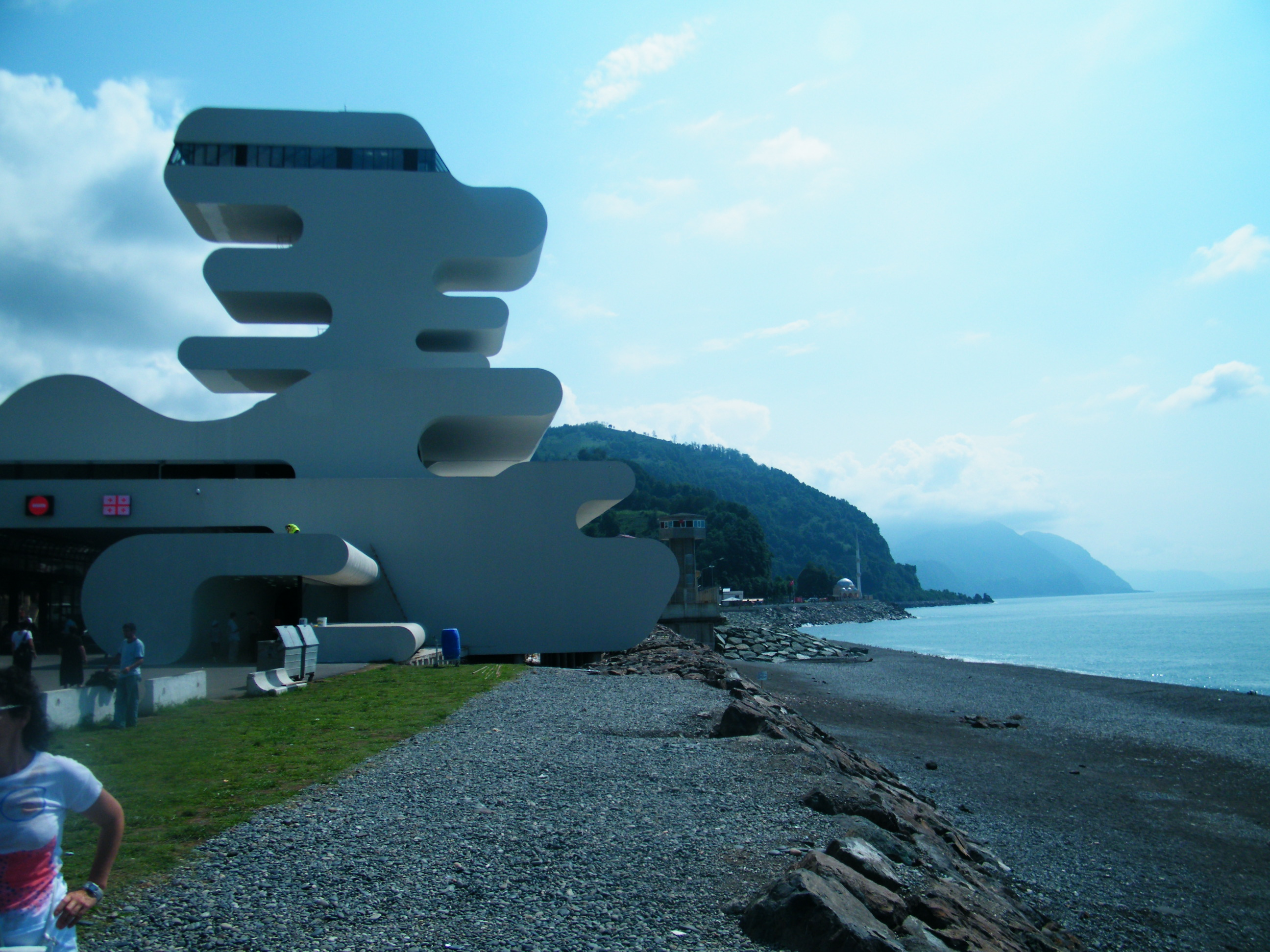
Border checkpoint in Sarpi, Georgia

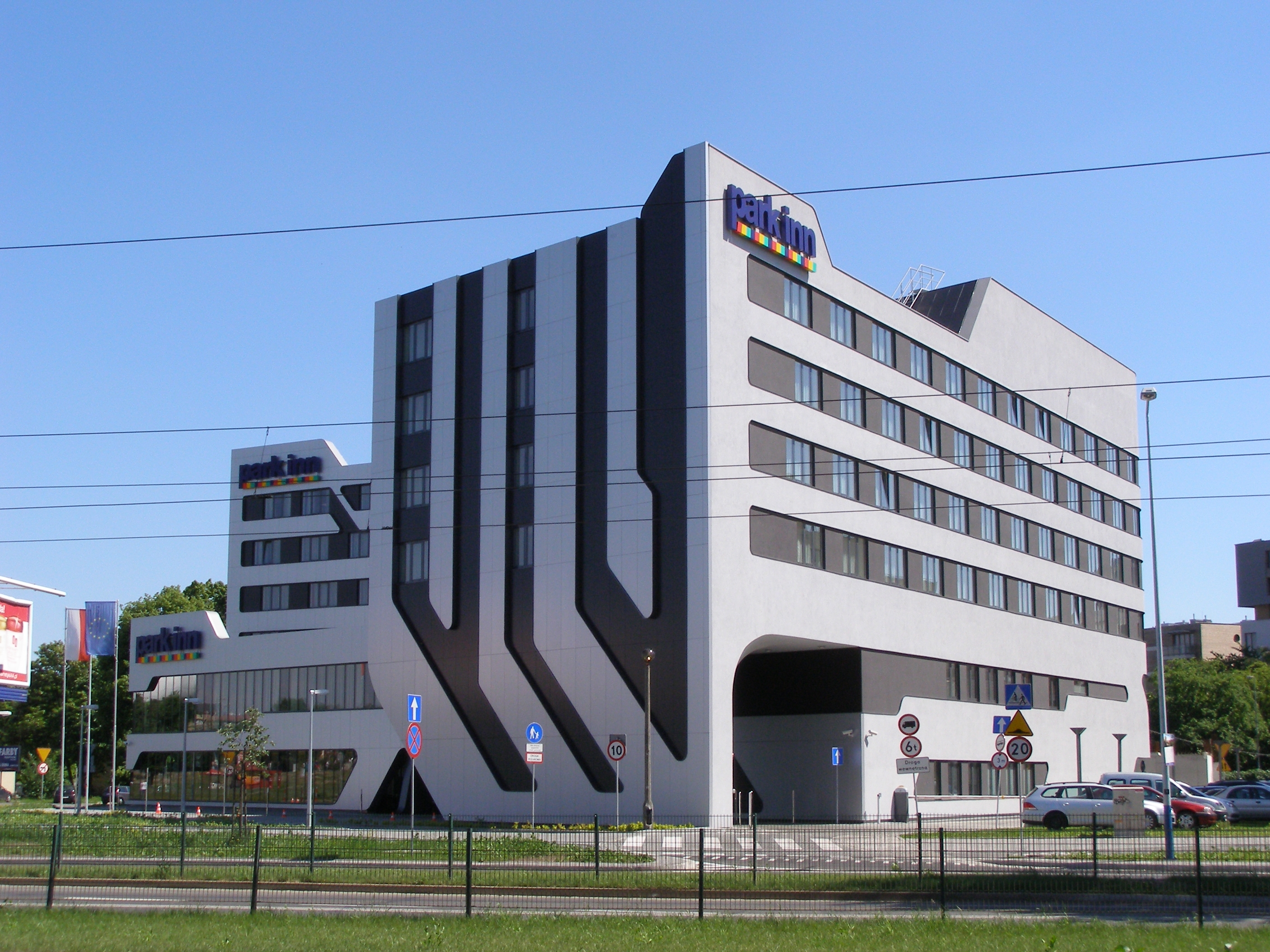
Park Inn Hotel in Kraków, Poland

Jürgen Hermann Mayer (born 1965 in Stuttgart) is a German architect and artist. He is the leader of the architecture firm "J. MAYER H." in Berlin and calls himself Jürgen Mayer H.

== Life and work ==
He studied at Stuttgart University, The Cooper Union and Princeton University. Since 1996 he has been working as an architect. Recent national and international projects include Metropol Parasol, the redevelopment of the Plaza de la Encarnación in Seville, Spain; the Court of Justice in Hasselt, Belgium; Pavilion KA300, built in celebration of Karlsruhe's 300th jubilee, and several public and infrastructural projects in Georgia—for example, an airport in Mestia, the border checkpoint in Sarpi, and three rest stops along the highway in Gori and Lochini. His work has been published and exhibited worldwide and is part of numerous collections including Museum of Modern Art (MoMA) New York and MoMA San Francisco and also private collections. National and international awards include the Mies-van-der-Rohe-Award-Emerging-Architect-Special-Mention-2003, Winner Holcim Award Bronze 2005 and Winner Audi Urban Future Award 2010. He has taught at Princeton University, Harvard University, Berlin University of the Arts, the Technical University of Munich, the Architectural Association in London, the Columbia University, New York City, at the University of Toronto, Canada, and has been a mentor at the international mentorship program Forecast, based in Berlin.

== Firm ==
J. MAYER H. was founded 1996 in Berlin. Since January 2014, when Andre Santer and Hans Schneider joined as partners in the firm, it has been called J. Mayer H. und Partner, Architekten. It focuses on works at the intersection of architecture, communication, and new technology. From urban planning schemes and buildings, to installation work and objects with new materials, the relationship between the human body, technology, and nature form the background for a new production of space.

== Important works (selection) ==
- Stadt.haus (Stadthalle Scharnhauser Park, Ostfildern), 2000–2002, exhibited in the Permanent Collection of Museum of Modern Art (MoMA) New York, the Biennial in Venice 2004, Arsenale and the German pavilion
- Rotor Penthouse, private building, Denmark, 2004–2006
- Mensa Moltke, Hochschule Karlsruhe, Germany, 2004–2007
- Metropol Parasol, redevelopment of the Plaza de la Encarnacion, Seville, Spain, 2004–2011
- ADA1, office building, Hamburg, Germany, 2005–2007
- Danfoss Universe, Nordborg, Denmark, 2005–2007
- Dupli.Casa, private house, near Ludwigsburg, Germany, 2005–2008
- Park Inn Hotel in Kraków, Poland 2007–2009
- S11, office building, Hamburg, Germany, 2007–2009.
- Highway Rest Stop 1 and 2, Gori and Lochini, Georgia, 2009 – 2011.
- Border Checkpoint, Sarpi, Georgia, 2010–2011
- Queen Tamar Airport, Mestia, Georgia, 2010.
- JOH3, residential building, Johannisstraße 3, Berlin, Germany, 2009–2011
- Pier Sculpture, Lazika, Georgia, 2012
- Court of Justice, Hasselt Belgium, in cooperation with a2o-architecten and Lensºass architecten, 2005–13
- Schaustelle, space for experiments, Munich, Germany, 2012–2013
- Sonnenhof, office and residential buildings, Jena, Germany, 2008–2014
- FOM, Düsseldorf, University building, Düsseldorf, Germany, 2012–2015
- Pavilion KA300, pavilion for the city jubilee, Karlsruhe, Germany, 2014–2015
- XXX Times Square With Love, installation in New York's Times Square, 2016
- IGZ Main Campus Building in Falkenburg, 2020

== Awards (selection) ==
- Mies-van-der-Rohe Award for emerging architects, 2003
- Holcim Award Bronze for the European region, 2005
- Audi Urban Future Award, 2010
- red dot design award, 2012, for Metropol Parasol
- Finalist European Union Prize for Contemporary Architecture, 2013 for Metropol Parasol

== Exhibitions (selection) ==
- Vitra Design Museum, 2007: Housewarming MyHome
- San Francisco, Museum, 2009: Patterns of Speculation
- La Biennale di Venezia, Italian pavilion, 2009: Pre.Text / Vor.Wand
- Global Design, Museum für Gestaltung, 2010: Pre.Text / Vor.Wand
- Showroom Euroboden, Munich, 2010: Re.Flecks
- Berlinische Galerie, 2011: RAPPORT. Experimentelle Raumstrukturen
- Art Institute of Chicago, 2012: Wirrwarr
- Galerie Eigen+Art, Berlin 2013: Black.See
- Lugadero, 2014: Retraro Robot
- Istanbul Design Biennial, 2014: NAP GAP
- Shenzhen Bi-City Biennial of Urbanism/Architecture, 2014: Border Warehouse
- InCITE Gallery, Bangalore, 2015: the work of J. Mayer H.
- Beijing Design Week, 2014: Exhibition Design+
- Istanbul Biennale Exhibition, 2015: FIN-GER
- Ecola exhibition, 2015: Hands-on

== Bibliography ==
- Architekturforum Aedes|Aedes Galerie und Architekturforum (ed.), Kristin Feireiss, Hans-Jürgen Commerell: J. Mayer H., surphase architecture. (exhibition catalogue). Aedes, Berlin 2002.
- Cristina Steingräber (ed.): metropol parasol, Staatliche Museen Berlin 2005, ISBN 3-88609-519-3
- Henry Urbach (ed.): J. Mayer H., Hatje Cantz, Ostfildern 2008, ISBN 978-3-7757-2223-0
- Neeraj Bhatia, Jürgen Mayer H. (ed.): arium, Hatje Cantz, Ostfildern 2009, ISBN 978-3-7757-2540-8
- Suh Kyong won (ed.): DD 19 Activators. DAMDI Architecture Publisher, Ostfildern 2011, ISBN 89-91111-21-1
- Berlinische Galerie (ed.): Rapport, 2011
- Andres Lepik, Andre Santer (ed.): metropol parasol, Hatje Cantz, Ostfildern 2011, ISBN 978-3-7757-2837-9
- J. Mayer H., Cristina Steingräber (ed.): Wirrwarr, Hatje Cantz, Ostfildern 2011, ISBN 978-3-7757-2837-9
- J. Mayer H. (ed.): A.WAY, Trademark Publishing 2011, ISBN 978-3-9813228-5-9.
- Wilko Hoffmann (ed.): Could Should Would, Hatje Cantz, Ostfildern 2015, ISBN 978-3-7757-4053-1

== Film ==
- Jürgen Mayer H. Der Architekt der Kurven. (Alternativtitel: J. Mayer H. – Architektur als Abenteuer.) documentary film, Germany, 2011, 26 min., book and direction: Claudius Gehr, production: planetfilm, NDR, arte, first broadcast: 16 December 2012 by arte.
