= Deutsche Schule Sevilla =

- Seville, Andalucia; Spain

Information
- Type: German international school
- Established: 1921
- Faculty: 58
- Grades: Kindergarten-second year of bachillerato
- Enrollment: 741

Deutsche Schule Albrecht Dürer or Deutsche Schule Sevilla (Spanish: Colegio Alemán Alberto Durero de Sevilla) is a German international school in Seville, Andalucia, Spain. As of 2016 there are 58 teachers and 741 students.

It was created in 1921. It serves kindergarten-second year of bachillerato.
