= Alfalfa, Seville =

Coordinates: 37°23′31″N 5°59′34″W

Alfalfa
- City neighborhood
- Country: Spain
- Region: Andalusia
- Municipality: Seville
- District: Casco Antiguo

Population (2010)
  - Total: 4,197

Alfalfa is a neighbourhood in the historical centre of Seville, the Casco Antiguo. It is located in the center of the district and bordered by Encarnación-Regina to the north, Santa Catalina and San Bartolomé to the east, Santa Cruz and El Arenal to the south and Museo to the west. In 2010, it had an estimated population of 4,197 inhabitants.
