= Bellavista-La Palmera =

Coordinates: 37°21′17″N 5°58′18″W

Bellavista-La Palmera (red) within Seville (yellow).

Bellavista-La Palmera is a district of the city of Seville, the regional capital of the Spanish region of Andalusia. It is situated on the eastern bank of the Guadalquivir river, to the south of the city centre (Casco Antiguo).

== Geography ==
The district is bordered by the Distrito Sur to the north. To the west, across the river on the Isla de La Cartuja, it borders the district of Los Remedios. The neighbouring municipality of Dos Hermanas borders the district to the east and south. The Guadaira river flows through the district before joining the Guadalquivir. The only territory in the whole of Seville to the south of the Guadaira is the neighbourhood of Bellavista, which transferred into the district from Dos Hermanas.

== Local businesses ==
The science and technology enterprise Abengoa is based in the district. The professional top-flight football club Real Betis play in the neighbourhood of Heliópolis, the source of their nickname Los Heliopitanos.
