= Avenida de la Constitución, Seville =

Avenida de la Constitución
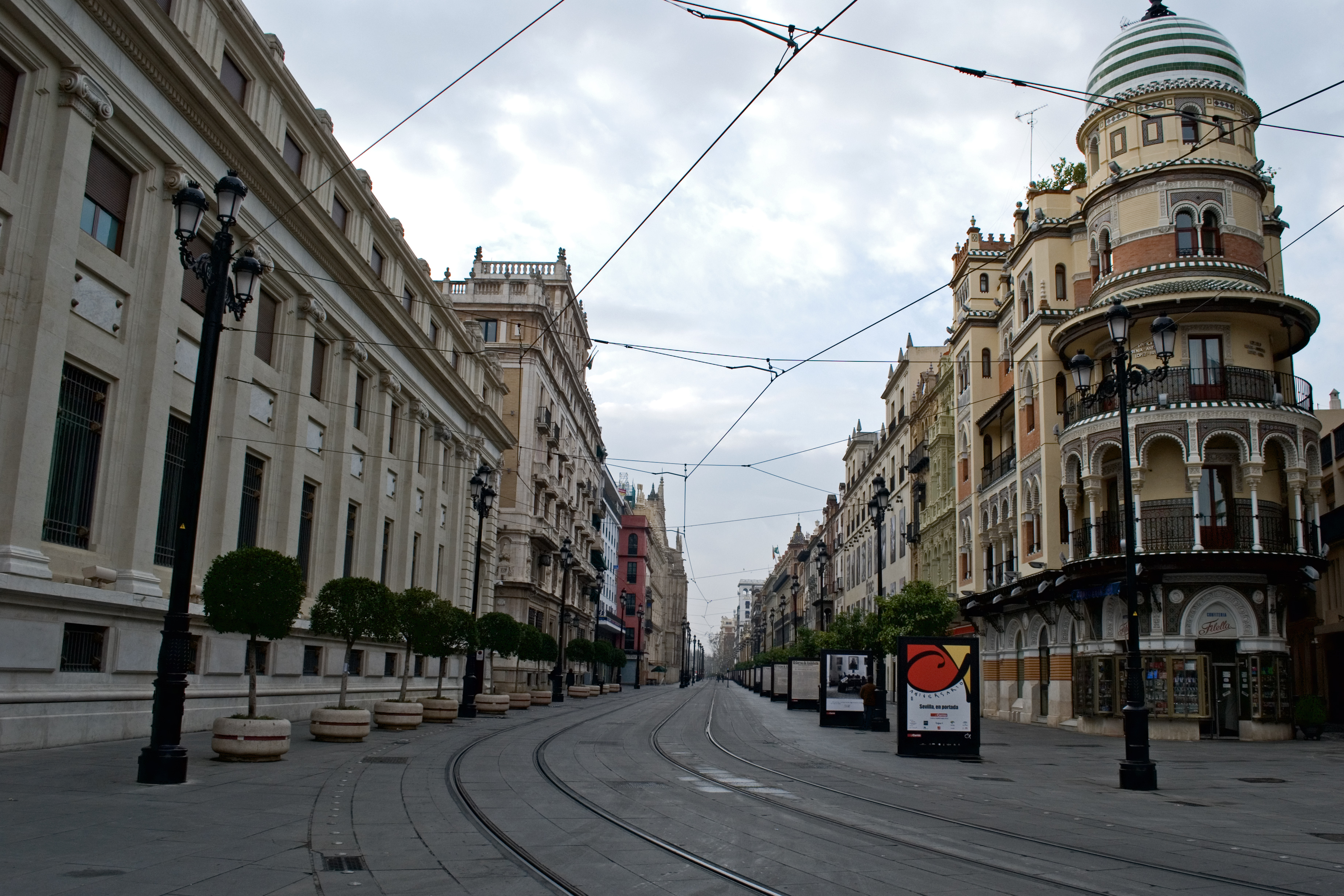

- Location within Andalusia
- Length: 600 m (0.37 mi)
- Location: Casco Antiguo, Seville
- Coordinates: 37°23′09″N 5°59′39″W
- From: Plaza Nueva/Plaza de San Francisco
- To: Puerta de Jerez

Construction
- Inauguration: 1915

Avenida de la Constitución is an important avenue in the Casco Antiguo district of Seville, Andalusia, Spain. It starts from the square known as Puerta de Jerez and reaches the Plaza Nueva, considered the center of the city and where the historic building of the Seville City Council is located. It has a length of 600 m (0.37 mi).

== History ==
The current avenue was outside the wall that marked the urban limit in Roman times. Some of its sections came to be occupied by a missing arm of the Guadalquivir River, from which the Alameda de Hércules crossed the Campana, the Plaza Nueva and emptied into the El Arenal area.

Avenida de la Constitución acquired economic importance from the late Middle Ages, mainly as a result of the construction of the new major mosque (inaugurated in 1176) and the subsequent Castilian conquest in 1248. Genoese merchants, moneychangers and artisans such as silversmiths settled there. (14th century), book printers (late 15th century) and tailors (16th century).

After the discovery of the Americas, and the choice of Seville as the exclusive port of the Indian trade, the commercial activity of the city increased, the steps of the cathedral served as a meeting place for merchants for their negotiations, where trips were advertised projected and products arrived from overseas. Its central point was the so-called Fuente del Hierro, located in the place currently occupied by the Iglesia del Sagrario. During the second half of the sixteenth century, the cathedral chapter, to avoid the excesses committed in the area by merchants, installed columns with chains around the temple and hired bailiffs to prevent the passage of pack animals on the street. Before the complaints of the Metropolitan Council, King Felipe II decided to build a building for the Lonja headquarters, which would be carried out on the same avenue, next to the cathedral, and which is currently the headquarters of the General Archive of the Indies.

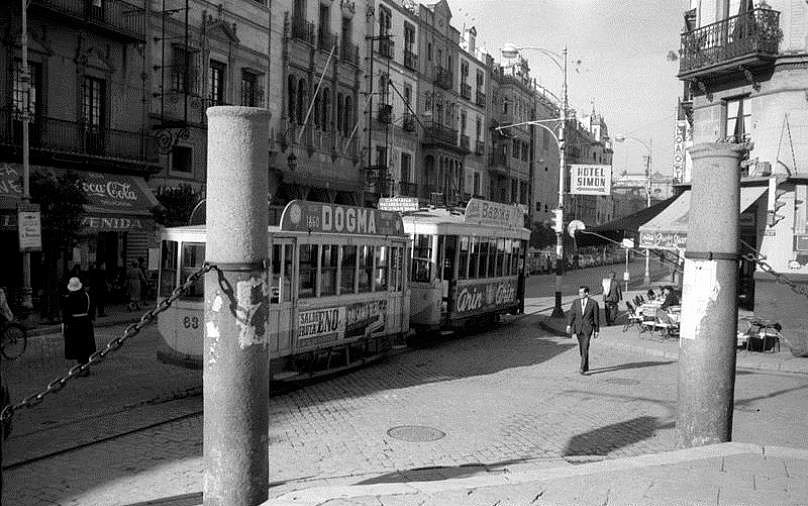
Corner of Avenida de la Constitución with Calle Alemanes, in 1954.

The current Avenida de la Constitución brings together in a single route as a result of several transformations proposed since 1863 and implemented in 1911 by the then mayor, Antonio Halcón y Vinent, within the framework of the reforms linked to the Ibero-American Exposition of 1929. Previously, there was Calle Génova, which began in the City Hall building, Gradas street, in front of the Seville Cathedral, and Calle La Lonja, in front of the current General Archive of the Indies. From this point, there was no avenue and if there was a series of buildings that made direct access to the current Jerez gate impossible, continuing in the building of the old seminary of Santa María de Jesús until arriving at the Casa de la Currency and finally to Puerta de Jerez.

Some 21,000 vehicles circulated daily along the avenue, emitting about 580 tons of gases, causing serious damage to the cathedral and the Archive of the Indies. On 17 April 2006, it was closed to traffic to carry out the works for its pedestrianization. In October 2007, the works were completed, and a tram line called metrocentro came into operation to block access to the city center.
