= Casa de las Sirenas =

Building in Seville Province, Spain

Coordinates: 37°23′57″N 5°59′40″W

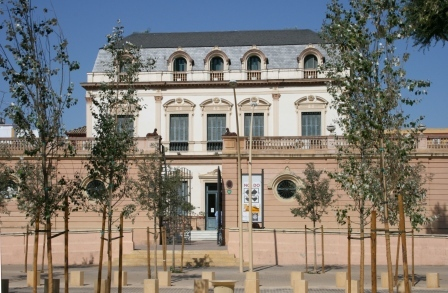
The Casa de las Sirenas

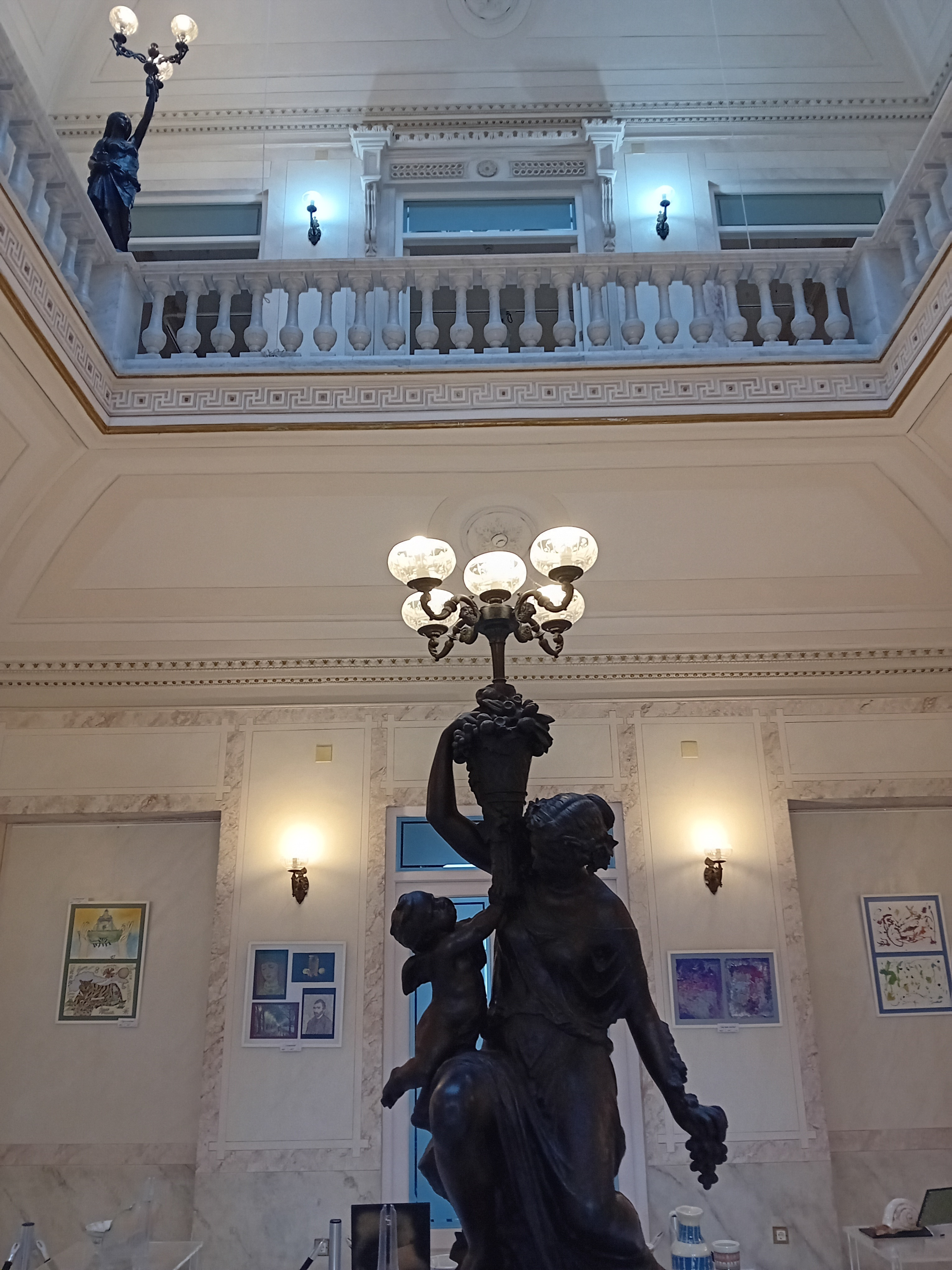
Covered central patio of the house.

The Casa de las Sirenas (House of the Sirens) is a 19th-century palace located on the Alameda de Hércules in Seville, Andalusia, Spain.

== History ==
The house was designed by Joaquín Fernández Ayarragaray for Lázaro Fernández de Angulo, the Marquess of Esquivel. It was constructed in the style of an 18th-century French mansion. The construction began in 1861 and was completed in 1864. The house features a square floor plan, surrounded by a garden enclosed by four walls. It has a ground floor and an upper floor. The building has a slate roof. It is named "Casa de las Sirenas" due to two sphinxes (referred to as "sirens") located at the front entrance.

The ironwork for the house was crafted in 1862 by Hermanos Portilla, with the same design being used for the Fábrica de Tabacos de Sevilla Royal Tobacco Factory.

The Marquess of Esquivel sold the house in 1870 to the construction company Basilio del Camino y Hermanos. The building later became the residence of José Domingo de la Portilla and his wife María Susana Pérez de Guzmán y Pickman, who died in 1971.

By the 1970s, the house had fallen into disrepair. The Seville City Council purchased the property in 1989. The house underwent a restoration that lasted eight years. In 1998, it was repurposed as a civic center for the neighborhood.
