= La Malena =

Spanish flamenco dancer

Magdalena Seda Loreto, better known as La Malena (Jerez de la Frontera, 1877 - Seville, 1956), was a Spanish Romani flamenco dancer.

== Artistic career ==
La Malena spent most of her artistic career in Seville, where she lived for more than 50 years. She was the niece of María La Chorrúa, an expert in dancing alegrías. She was La Malena's first teach, and taught her to move her arms and hands gracefully. As her popularity increased, La Malena began performing at singing cafés.

La Malena danced in the style of La Macarrona, who was her neighbor in Alameda de Hércules (Seville), and the two had similar careers. La Malena later ended up in the company of La Argentinita. In 1911, she embarked on her first tour, during which she visited Russia in the company of Maestro Realito. In the 1940s she worked for Concha Piquer. Later, she was the first dancer in the flamenco group for the Casino de la Exposición in Seville called "Malena y sus gitanas" (Malena and her gypsies).

Despite her great success, the artist spent her later years selling sweets in a street stall in the Alameda de Hércules, poor and forgotten.

Manuel Vallejo wrote about her:

"La Malena meant and combined all the grace, all the charm and all the best style of an art learned and acquired by her with true devotion, she put all her soul and all her senses [...]."

José Manuel Caballero Bonald also considered Malena to be among the greatest flamenco dancers of all time, saying:

"Malena's dancing, learned from that of Chorrúa, was like an unleashed vertigo of inspiration, like an electric jolt of the flesh. It is said that, at some moments, the dancer was subjected to a continuous syncope that was terrifying to watch"

== Bibliography ==
- Fernando el de Triana, Arte y artistas flamencos, Imprenta Helénica, Madrid, 1935
- El Imparcial (Madrid. 1867).Hemeroteca digital, BNE 20-4-1933
- Heraldo de Madrid. Hemeroteca digital, BNE, 20-5-1933
