= Los Remedios (district) =

District of Seville, Andalusia, Spain

Coordinates: 37°22′28.92″N 5°59′51.21″W

Location of Los Remedios (red) in Seville (yellow).

Los Remedios is a district of Seville, the regional capital of Andalusia, Spain. It is located on the Isla de La Cartuja, south of the district of Triana, between two forks of the Guadalquivir river. It is linked by bridge to the city centre (Casco Antiguo) and the districts of Distrito Sur and Bellavista-La Palmera. From the western side of the island, it is linked by road bridge to the city of San Juan de Aznalfarache and shares a boundary in the Guadalquivir with the city of Gelves. The southern tip of La Cartuja is opposite the municipality of Dos Hermanas.

Los Remedios takes its name from a Carmelite convent of the same name found in the district. Before urban development in the latter half of the 20th century, the convent was one of the few structures in what is now Los Remedios. The Port of Seville has been located in this district since silting forced it to leave the El Arenal neighbourhood in the city centre.

== Background ==
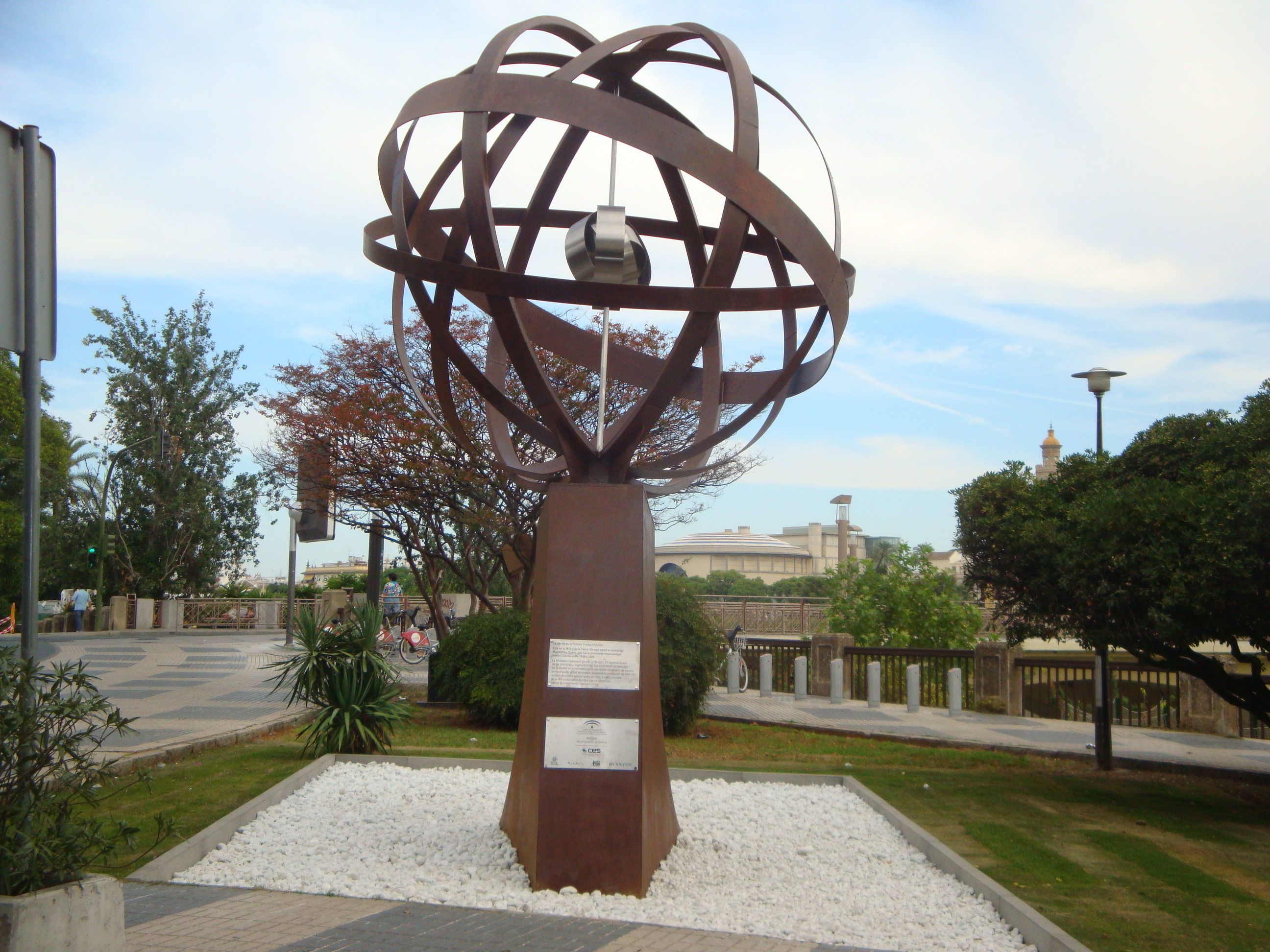
Sculpture to Elcano in the Plaza de Cuba near the Guadalquivir.

In 1945 the Avenida de la Republica Argentina was built and was to become, in the next two decades, the district's main artery into the centre of Seville. The avenue runs like a dividing line between Triana and Los Remedios, ending at Plaza de Cuba, where the Puente San Telmo carries traffic over to Puerta de Jerez on the other side of the Guadalquivir.

In the 1960s a large-scale urbanization took place, and the new residential construction led to the city's first planned neighbourhood. It is overwhelmingly residential in character, and when it was built it attracted many upper-middle class residents. Today the main commercial thoroughfares are the Avenida de la Republica Argentina and Calle Asuncion.

== Sites ==
The Recinto Ferial, where Seville's Feria de Abril is held, is located in Los Remedios, outside its street grid near its southwestern end. A new fairground is being developed, however, in Charco de la Pava in La Cartuja.

The Seville Metro currently has 2 stations along the periphery of Los Remedios. Line 1 serves the Parque del Principe and Plaza de Cuba stations, also Line 4 will serve the Virgen de Oliva station. Line 1 runs in a SW-SE arc from one suburb to another, running through central Seville. Line 4 will be the sole circular line and is expected to open in 2017.

== Neighborhoods ==
- Tablada (neighborhood)
- Los Remedios

== See also ==
- Districts and neighbourhoods of Seville
