= Alameda de Hércules =

Garden square in Seville, Spain

Coordinates: 37°23′55.77″N 5°59′38.88″W

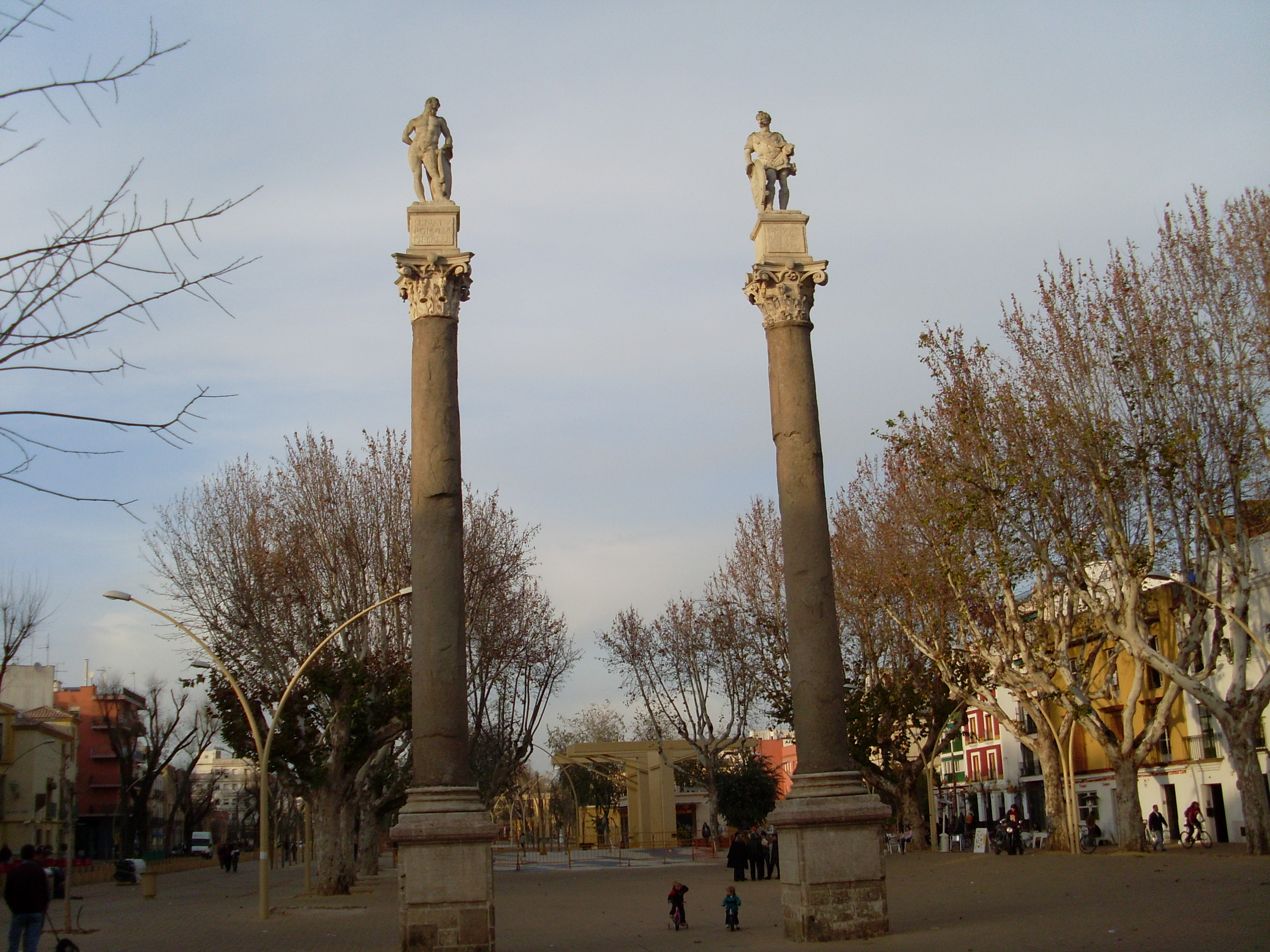
Roman columns with statues of Hercules and Julius Caesar

The Alameda de Hércules (Hercules mall), or simply La Alameda, is a garden square or mall in Seville, southern Spain. Built in 1574, it was originally a promenaded public garden, named after the eight rows of white poplar trees (álamos in Spanish) that fill its central part. Located in the northern half of the city's casco antiguo (historic center), between the Guadalquivir River and the Macarena neighbourhood, it was the oldest public garden in Spain and Europe.

== History ==
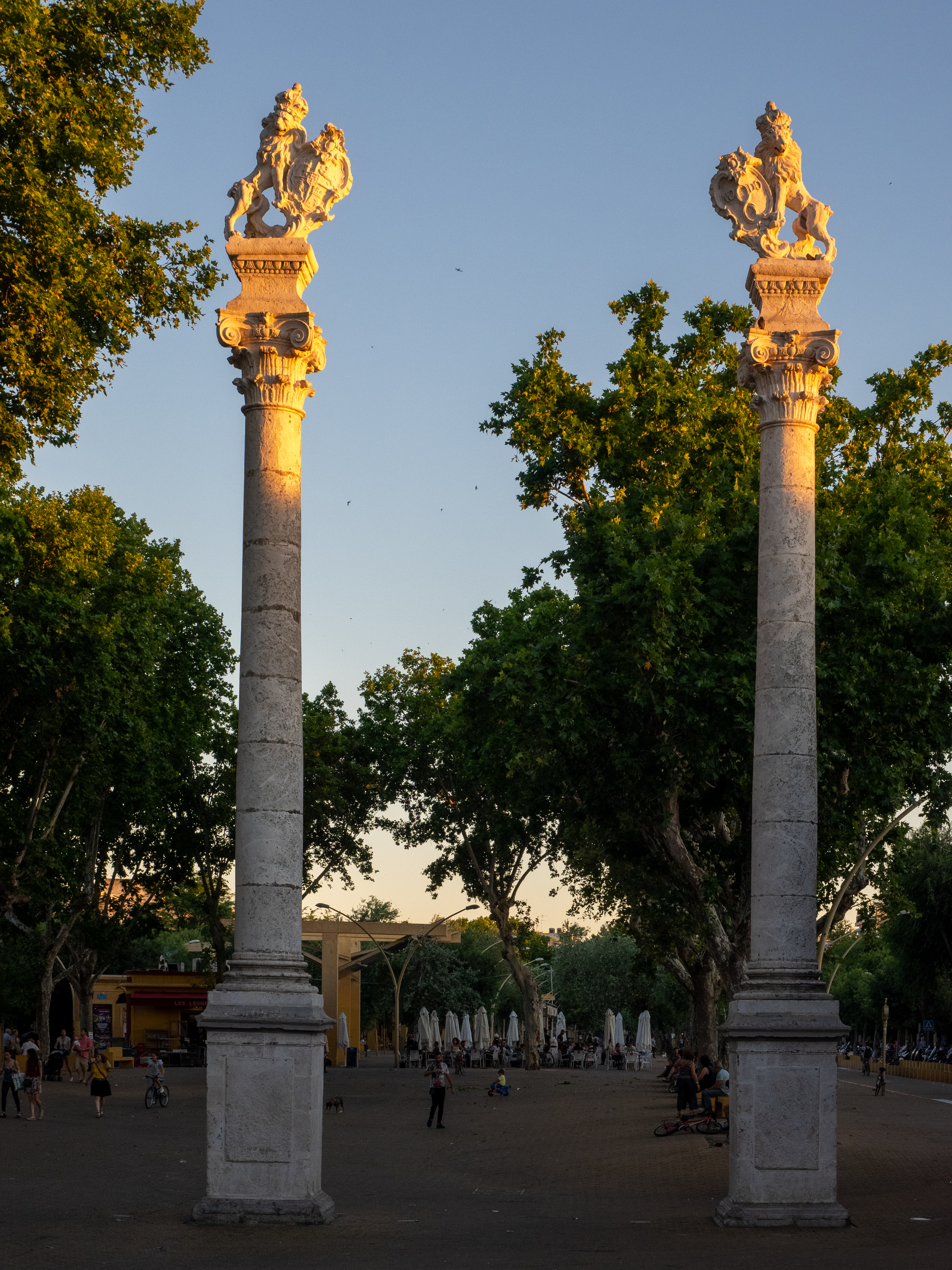
Photos of the Lions on the Northern side

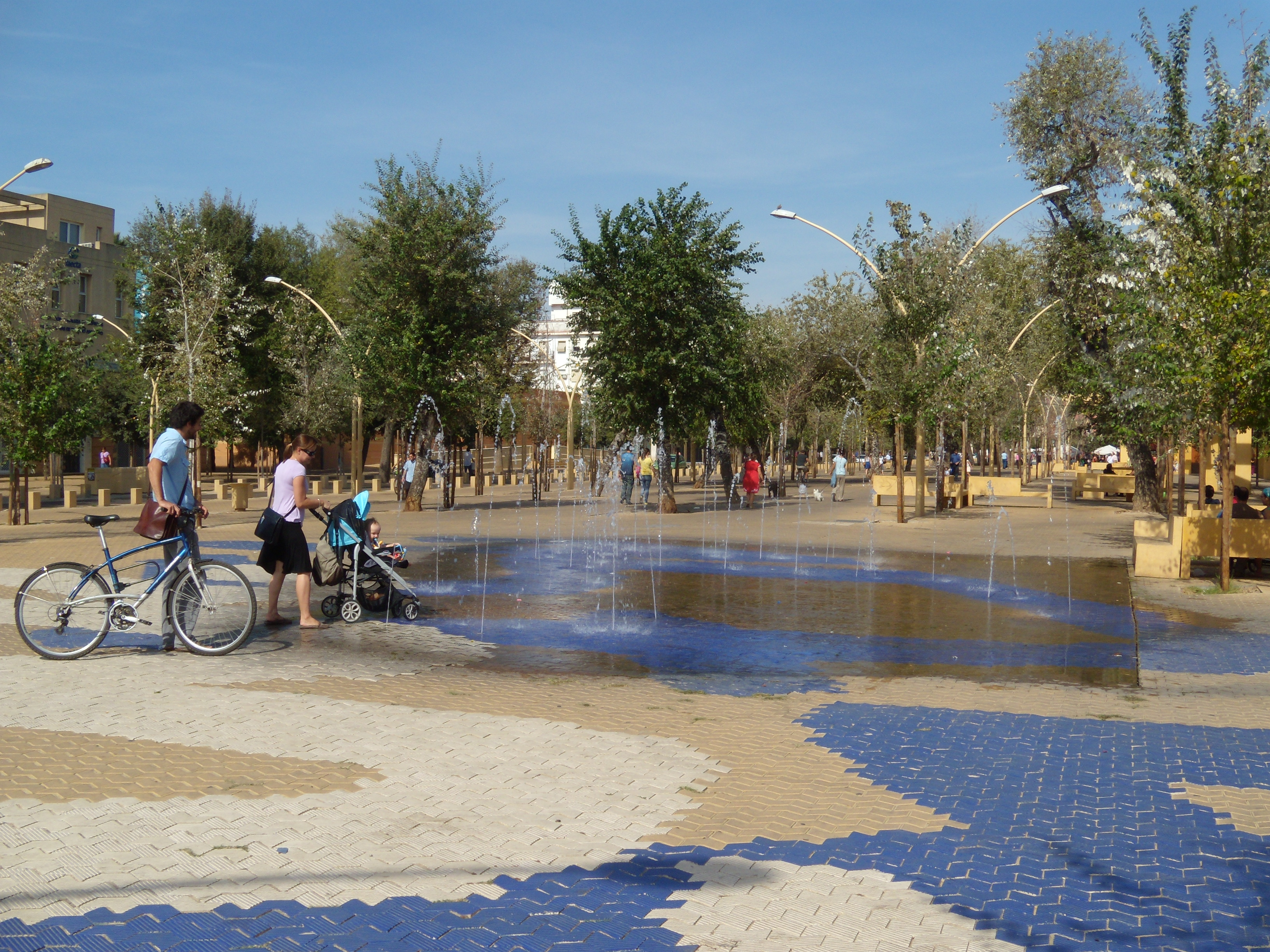
Fountains in La Alameda

Before its urban transformation, the Alameda square was a fragment of the easternmost branch of the Guadalquivir River. It crossed the city center via Alameda towards Plaza Nueva, eventually ending in the El Arenal neighbourhood. After it was cut off by a dam in 1383, the river basin turned into a swampy pond fed by the aquifer and frequent rises of the river.

In 1574, the Count of Barajas further drained the water, building irrigation channels and fountains, and planting lines of waterside white poplar trees. Four columns were placed to mark off a promenade through the trees. In the beginning it was planned to take four columns from the remains of the Roman temple of Mármoles street, believed to be dedicated to Hercules. However, when moving the third column it fell apart, leaving the work temporarily unfinished. Consequently, the two columns at the southern end of the square are from the original Roman temple, whereas the northern columns are modern reproductions. As the culmination of this project, two sculptures were placed atop the two southern columns: Hercules (mythological founder of Seville) and Julius Caesar (referred to as the restorer of the city during Roman rule). In the second half of the eighteenth century, two additional statues of lions with shields, representing Seville and Spain, were placed on the northern columns.

In the late 19th century, the Alameda was a meeting place of the upper-classes, with many elegant theaters and kiosks. However, after the Spanish Civil War, the Alameda began to suffer a progressive deterioration, and became one of the poorest neighbourhoods of Seville, troubled by prostitution and drugs. According to data from 1989, the area housed up to 35 brothels.

A slow recovery began during the early 21st century, then public redevelopment funded by the city council totally renewed La Alameda in 2006-2008. Road traffic was limited, and a number of kiosks, benches and fountains installed. The promenade was also restored with the planting of many white poplar and European hackberry trees. La Alameda is now one of the main nightlife centers of Seville.

Despite flood-control infrastructure built in the earlier transformation of the square during the 16th and 17th centuries, La Alameda remained as one of the most floodable areas of the city until the second half of the 20th century. Accordingly, during the Great Plague of 1649 it was reported that the Alameda was so flooded that people crossed the square on boats. Recently engineered changes in the river-channel system of the Guadalquivir river, as well as the installation of a huge underground cistern to retain stormwater, have improved drainage and prevented new flooding events in the area.

== Monuments and buildings ==
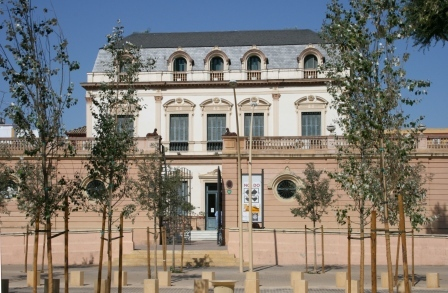
Casa de las Sirenas, Mermaid's House

Apart from the Roman columns that head the promenade, some other notable features are located in La Alameda.

On its western side is found the Casa de las Sirenas (literally, "mermaid's house") a 19th-century French-inspiration palace that is used today as a civic center hosting expositions, workshops, classes, and cultural activities for the neighbourhood.

Placed at the northern end, the chapel of Nuestra Señora del Carmen y Cruz del Rodeo is an important landmark in the neighbourhood. It was an important source of inspiration for José Zorrilla's play Don Juan Tenorio, since here is the convent where the saintly Doña Inés was cloistered.

Also quite close to the Alameda on the street dedicated to the restorer of La Alameda, the Count of Barajas (Conde de Barajas), is the house where the romantic writer Gustavo Adolfo Bécquer was born.

== Nightlife ==
The neighborhood is now known as a key nightlife center of Seville for its vibrant alternative and diverse atmosphere. The entertainment options in La Alameda range from Heavy Metal or Funk music performances to live Flamenco. Apart from disco-pubs, many Nouvelle Cuisine and traditional restaurants, tapas and cocktail bars, cafés and Arab-style tearooms are found in and around the promenade. La Alameda is also the gay-friendly quarter of Seville, with gay pubs and discotèques spotting the area.

== Sources ==
- Léon Vela, José (2000). La Alameda de Hércules y el centro urbano de Sevilla: hacia un reequilibrio del casco antiguo. Seville: University of Seville. ISBN 84-472-0584-3.
- Albardonendo Freire, Antonio José (2002). El urbanismo de Sevilla durante el reinado de Felipe II. Seville: Guadalquivir. pp. 191–208.
