= Districts and neighbourhoods of Seville =

Map of Seville's districts

Seville, the capital of the region of Andalusia in Spain, has 11 districts, further divided into 108 neighbourhoods.

== Casco Antiguo ==
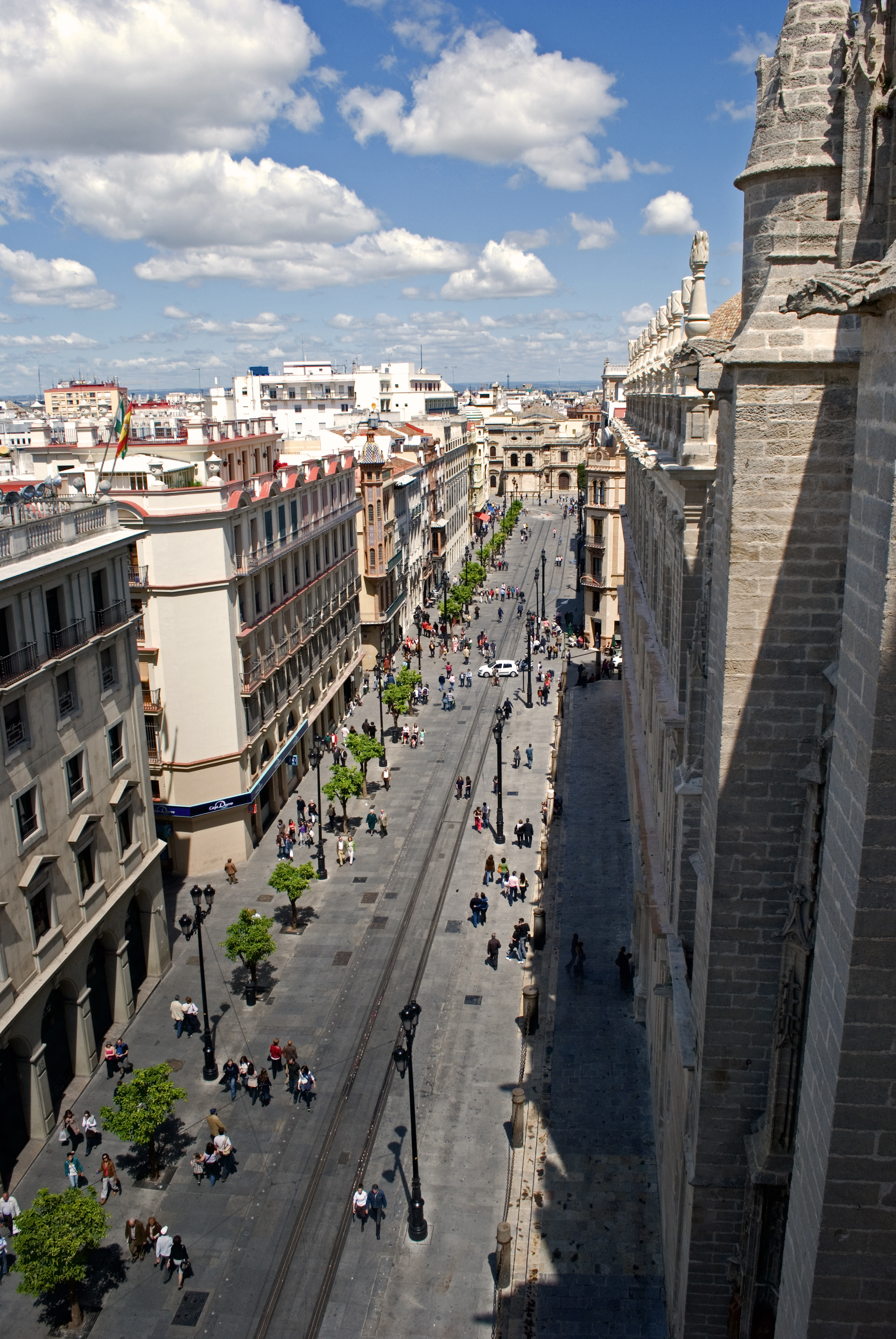
Avenida de la Constitución, one of the most important streets in the city.

The Casco Antiguo (Spanish: Ancient Shell) is the old quarter of Seville, in the centre of the city on the east bank of the Guadalquivir river. Principal tourist attractions are located here, such as the cathedral, the Alcázar, the Torre del Oro, the City Hall, the Palace of San Telmo, the Archivo General de Indias and the Metropol Parasol. Of its twelve neighbourhoods, El Arenal on the riverfront was the port of Seville until the Guadalquivir silted up in the 17th century, while the neighbouring Santa Cruz neighbourhood was a Jewish quarter until the Spanish Inquisition.

The University of Seville is mainly based in the former Royal Tobacco Factory in the south of the Casco Antiguo, the setting to the story and opera Carmen. The city's bullring is in El Arenal.

Neighbourhoods:

- Alfalfa
- Arenal
- Encarnación-Regina
- Feria
- Museo
- San Bartolomé
- San Julián
- San Gil
- San Lorenzo
- San Vicente
- Santa Catalina
- Santa Cruz

== Distrito Sur ==
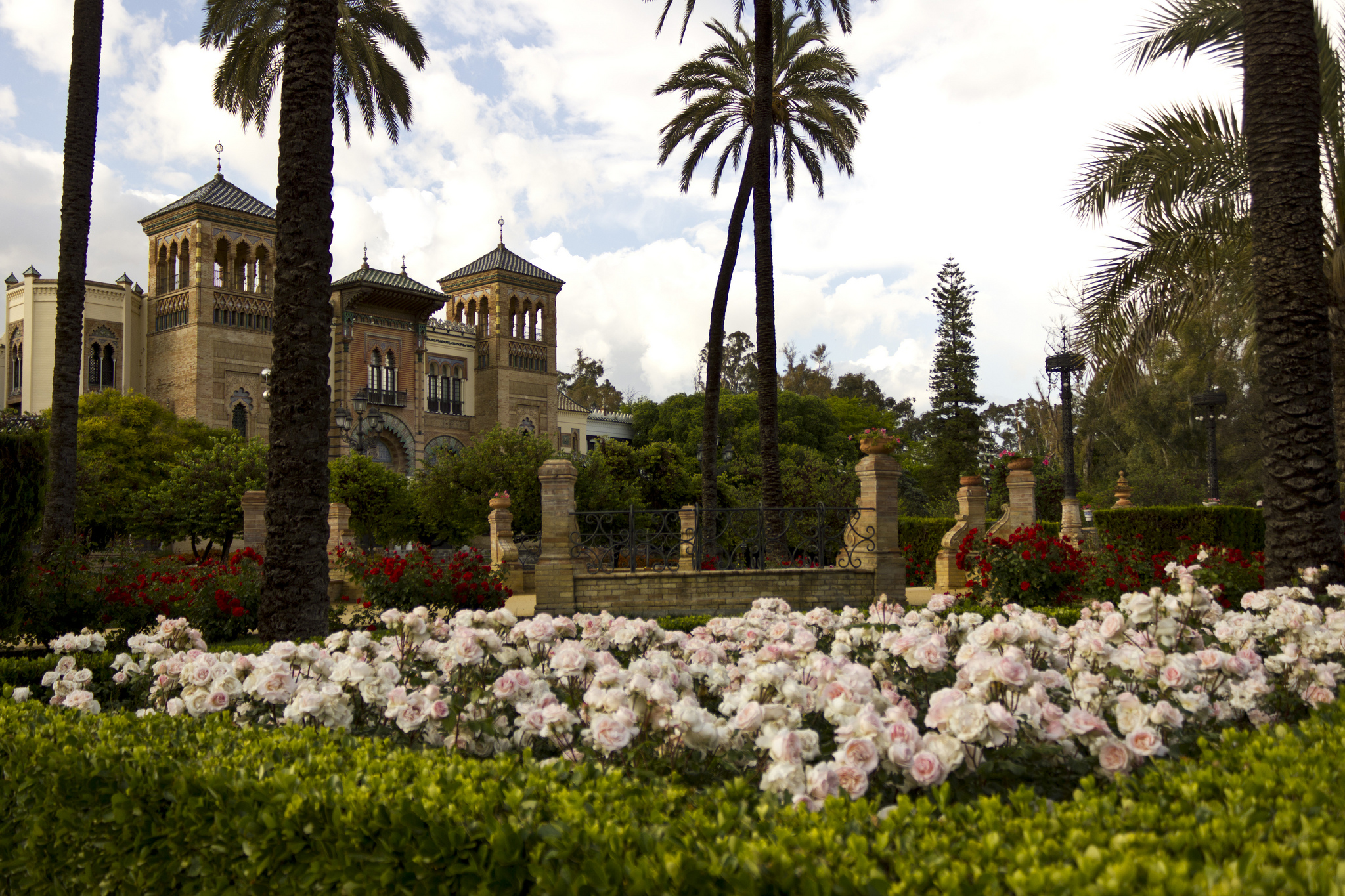
The former Mudejar Pavilion in the Parque de Maria Luisa is now used as the Museum of Arts and Traditions of Sevilla.

The Distrito Sur (Spanish: South District) lies to the south of the Casco Antiguo on the east bank of the Guadalquivir. It was the location of most of the buildings during the Ibero-American Exposition of 1929: the Plaza de España, the Parque de María Luisa, Archeological Museum of Seville and the Museum of Arts and Traditions of Sevilla.

Neighbourhoods:

- Bami
- Felipe II-Los Diez Mandamientos
- Giralda Sur
- Huerta de la Salud
- El Juncal
- Las Letanías
- La Oliva
- El Plantinar
- Polígono Sur
- El Porvenir
- Prado
- Tabladilla-La Estrella
- Tiro de Línea

== Triana ==
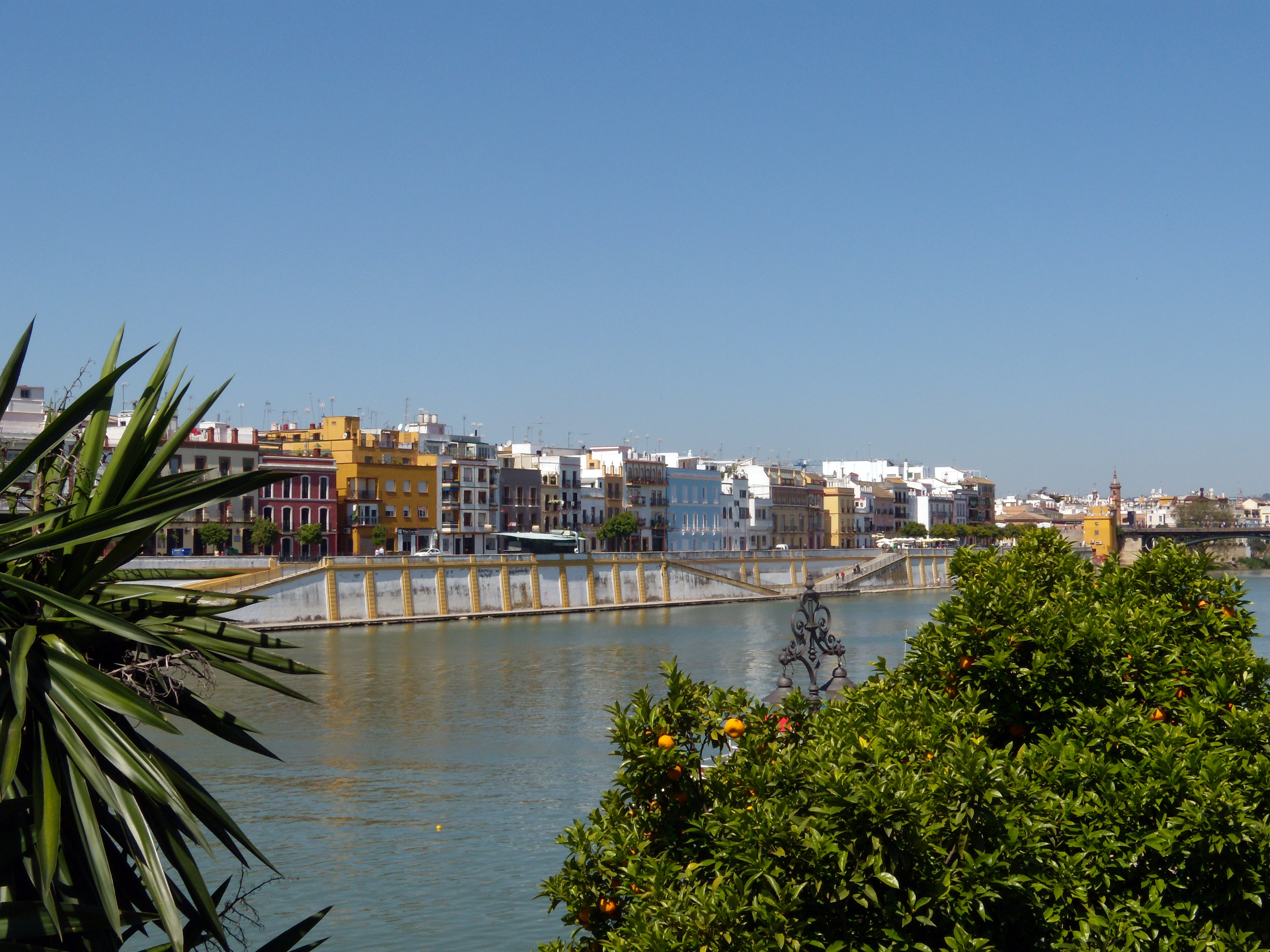
Betis Street (Triana) and Guadalquivir River

According to legend, Triana is named after the Roman Emperor Trajan, who was born in Italica, a Roman city north of modern Seville. Triana is known as a working-class and gypsy district. It was a centre for the ceramics industry. Like other districts that were historically split from the main city, Triana was known as an arrabal. The district is placed in a near-island position between two branches of the Guadalquivir west of the Casco Antiguo, narrowly linked to the mainland in the north.

This district has many historical buildings, such as the Santa Ana Church and the remains of the San Jorge Castle. The old quarter of the district offers a panoramic view of Seville's city centre. At the north of the district is the island of La Cartuja, a research and development park, site of Expo 92, from which some buildings were kept. The Isla Mágica amusement park is on the island, as is the 60,000-seater Estadio de La Cartuja, built for Seville's unsuccessful bids for the 2000 and 2004 Summer Olympics.

Neighbourhoods:

- Barrio León
- Cartuja
- Tardón
- Triana Casco Antiguo
- Triana Este
- Triana Oeste.

== Macarena ==
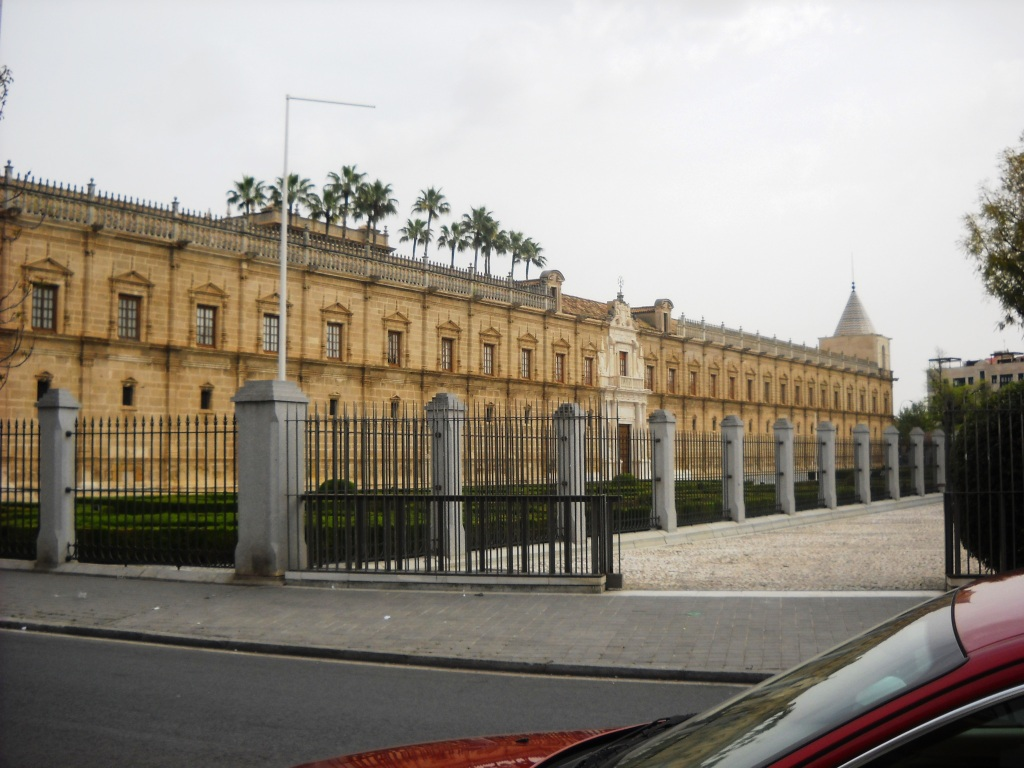
The Andalusian Parliament meets in the Hospital de las Cinco Llagas in the Macarena.

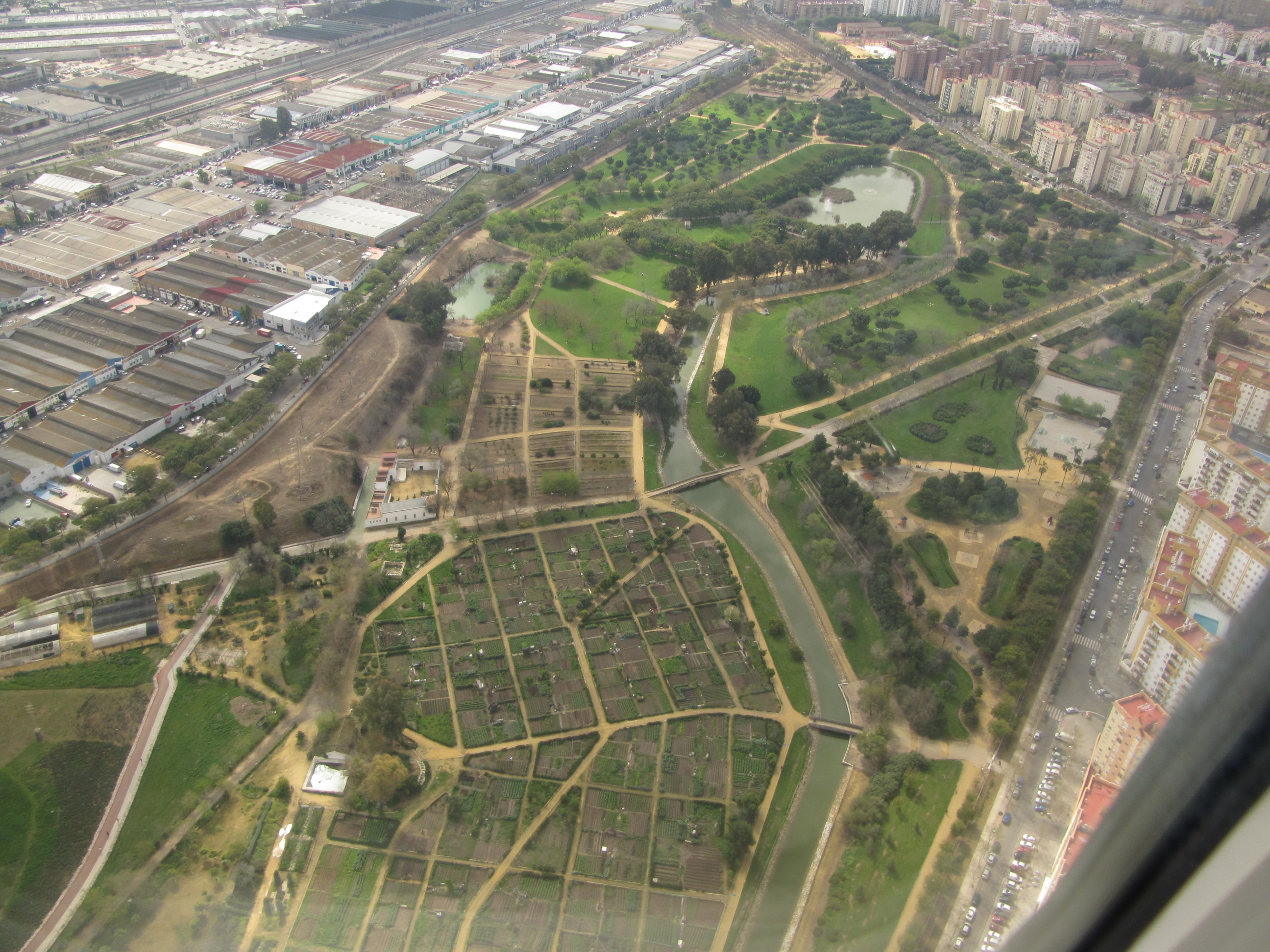
Miraflores Park in Macarena District

Macarena is the traditional and historical name of the area of Seville located north of the Casco Antiguo on the eastern bank of the Guadalquivir. Nowadays, La Macarena is the name of the neighborhood placed on both sides of the north city wall, but also a much bigger administrative district of Seville. Among other monuments, the Basilica of Nuestra Señora de la Esperanza Macarena, the Macarena Gate and the Parliament of Andalusia are in the district.

El Rinconcillo, a tapas bar built in the 1670s in the Macarena, is the oldest tapas bar in Seville and likely to be the oldest specifically-built tapas bar in the world. The 45-metre-high Torre de Perdigones (Spanish: Tower of Pellets) has been converted into a camera obscura with views of the city centre and the Expo 92 site on the Isla de La Cartuja.

Neighbourhoods:

- Las Avenidas
- La Barzola
- Begoña
- La Carrasca
- Campos de Soria
- El Cerezo
- Cisneo Alto
- Cruz Roja
- Doctor Barraquer
- La Fontanilla
- Grupo Renfe
- Hermandades del Trabajo
- Huerta del Carmen
- Macarena Tres Huertas
- Macarena 5
- Miraflores
- La Palmilla-Doctor Marañón
- La Paz-Las Golondrinas
- León XIII-Los Naranjos
- Pino Flores
- Pío XII
- Polígono Norte
- Los Príncipes
- Retiro Obrero
- El Rocío
- San Nicolás
- Santa María de Ordas
- Santas Justa y Rufina
- El Torrejón y Villegas

== Nervión ==
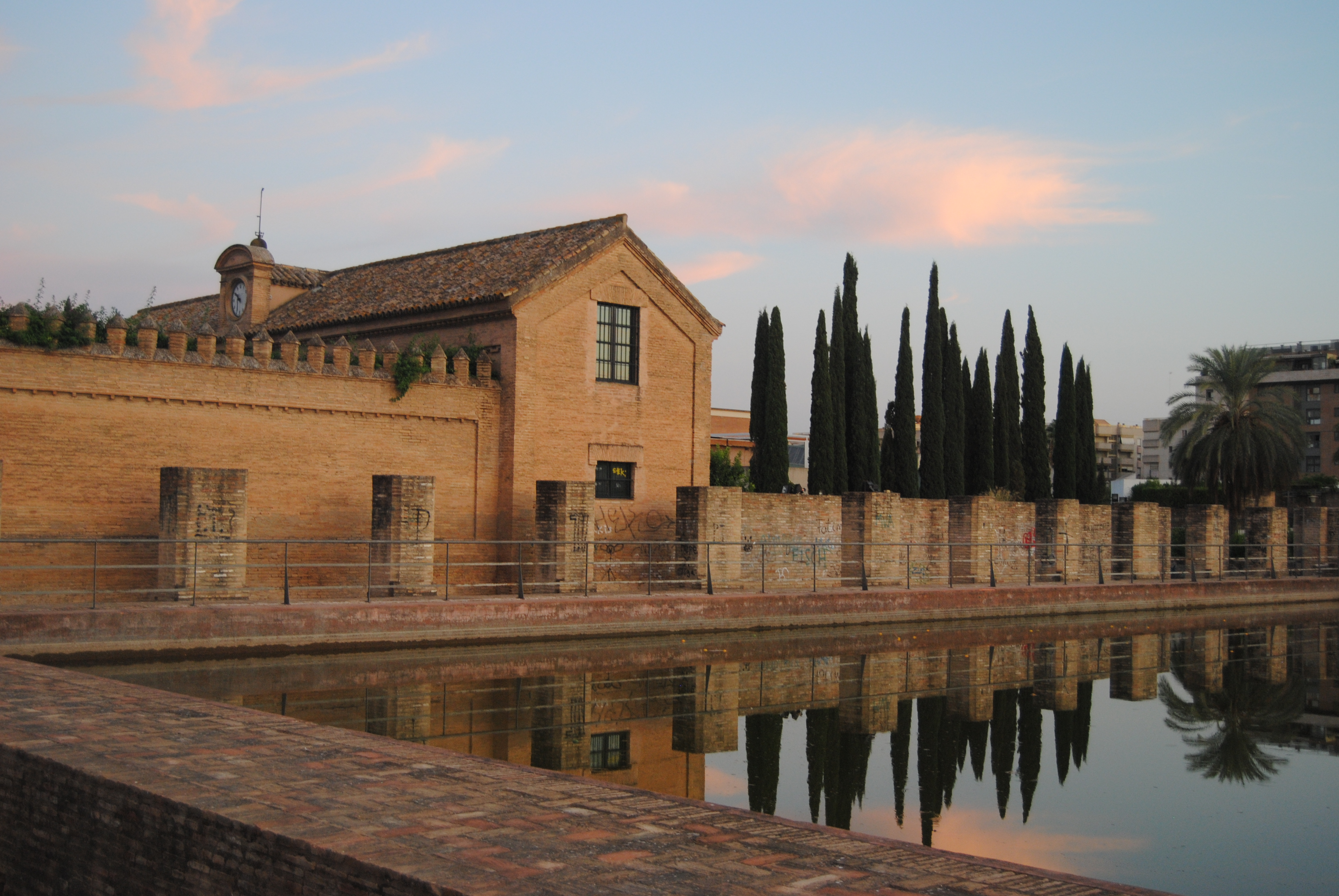
The Buhaira Gardens in Nervión

Nervión is in the east of Seville. The district is an important commercial district of the city, where much of the regional capital's business takes place. It is the second focal point of the city, and is home to a number of important sites including Santa Justa, Seville's major train station, with high-speed links via the AVE to Madrid, Córdoba, and Cádiz.

The Estadio Ramón Sánchez Pizjuán is home to Sevilla FC, one of Seville's two football teams in the top flight of La Liga. The area's name is the origin of one of Sevilla FC's nicknames Los Nervionenses. The Facultad de Ciencias Económicas y Empresariales (School of Business) of the University of Seville is in this district.

Neighbourhoods:

- Nervión
- San Bernardo
- Huerta del Pilar
- La Florida
- La Buhaira
- La Calzada
- San Roque
- Ciudad Jardín

== Distrito Norte ==
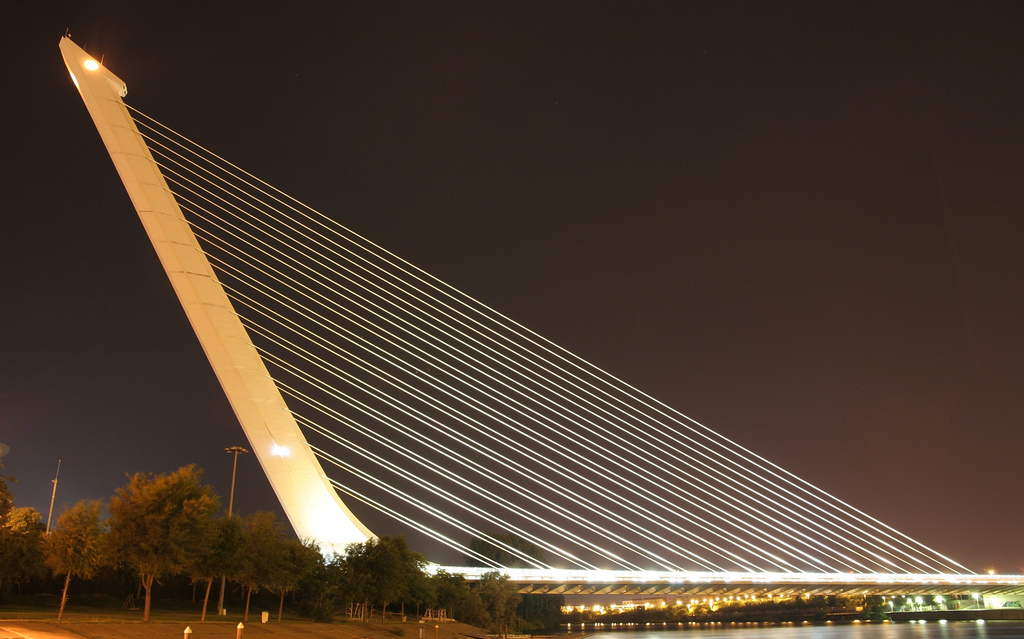
The Alamillo Bridge links Distrito Norte to the Isla de La Cartuja in Triana.

The Distrito Norte (Spanish: North District) occupies an area to the north of the Macarena on the east bank of the Guadalquivir. The Puente del Alamillo was built before Expo 92 to link across the river to the main Expo sites on the far north of the Isla de La Cartuja.

Neighbourhoods

- Pino Montano
- Consolación
- El Gordillo
- Las Almenas
- San Jerónimo
- La Bachillera
- Los Carteros
- San Diego
- Los Arcos
- Las Naciones-Parque Atlántico-Las Dalias
- San Matías
- Aeropuerto Viejo
- Valdezorras

== Los Remedios ==
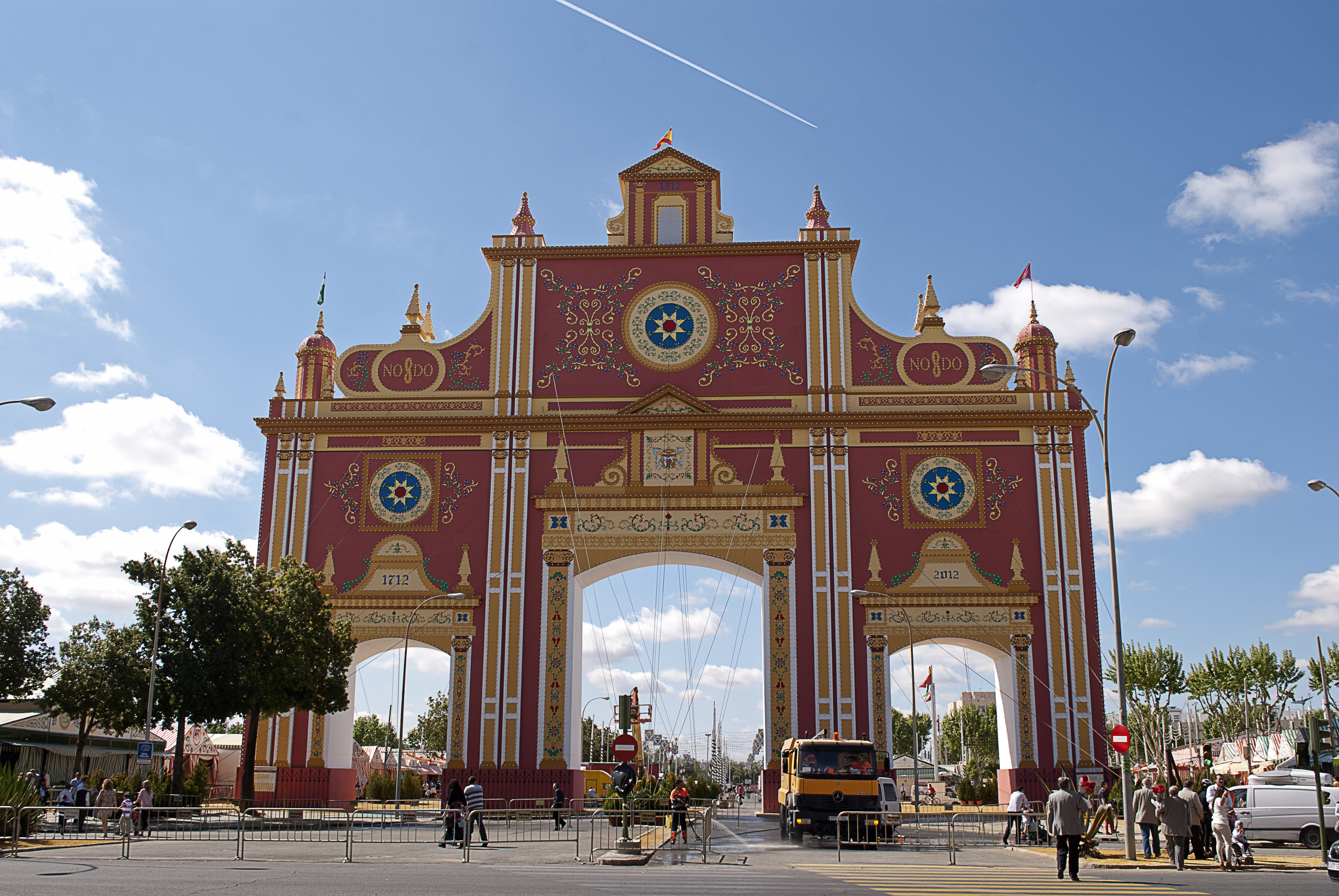
The main entrance to the Seville Fair 2012, in Los Remedios.

Los Remedios is located on the Isla de La Cartuja on the west bank of the Guadalquivir, to the south of Triana. It derives its name from a Carmelite convent of the same name found in that area. Before development in the latter half of the 20th century, this was one of the few standing structures in what is now Los Remedios. Seville's modern port is in the southern tip of this district, having moved south from the neighbourhood of El Arenal in the Casco Antiguo in the 17th century. Attractions: The Parque de los Príncipes, the Seville Fair, the Puente de San Telmo, the Museo de Carruajes, Los Remedios' tower and the Cuba Square.

Neighbourhoods

- Tablada
- Los Remedios

== Este-Alcosa-Torreblanca ==
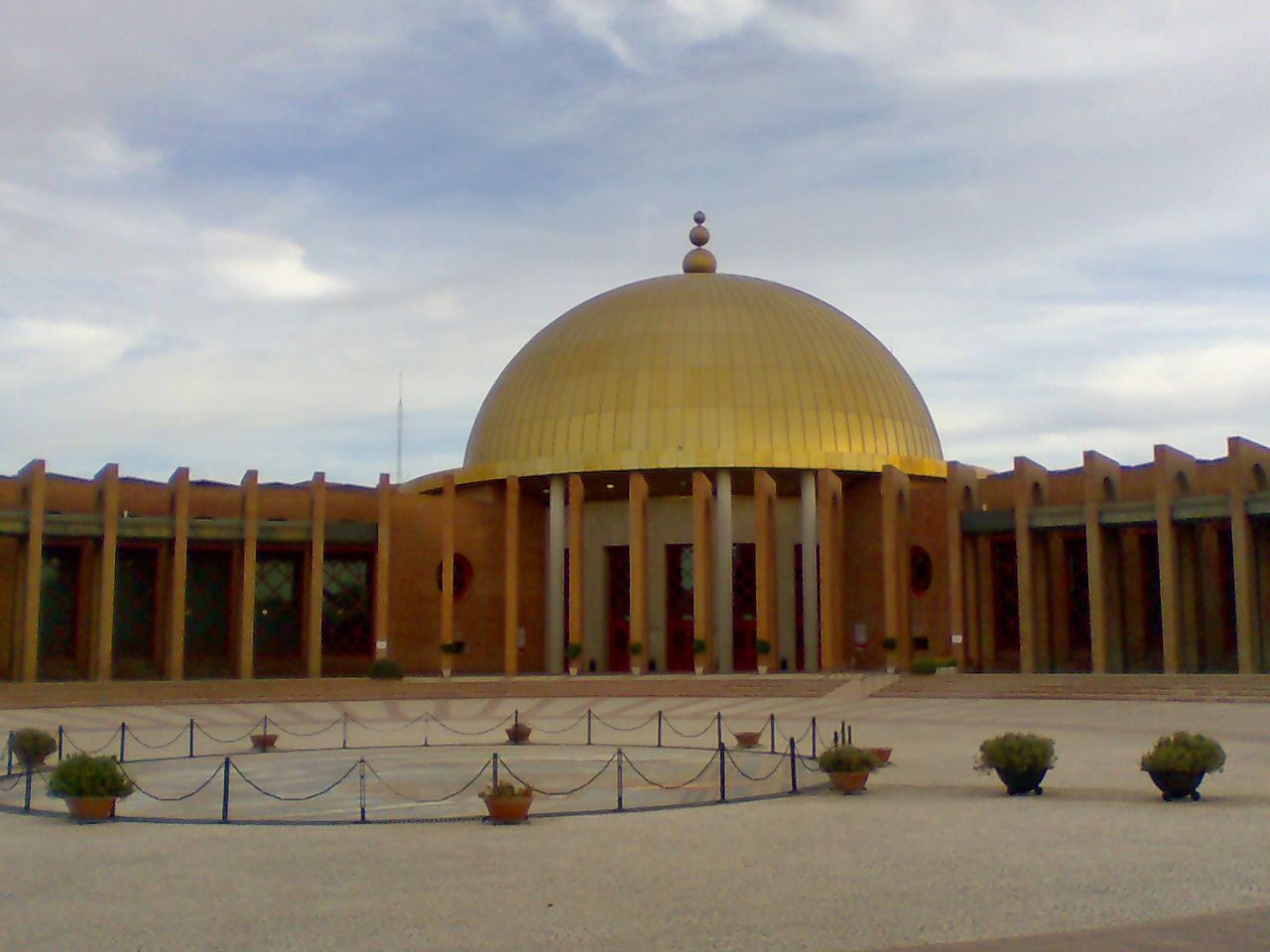
Convention centre in Este-Alcosa-Torreblanca

Seville's international airport, San Pablo is in this district, which lies on the north bank of the Guadaira, a tributary of the Guadalquivir.

Neighbourhoods

- Colores-Entreparques
- Torreblanca
- Parque Alcosa-Jardines del Edén
- Palacio de Congresos-Urbadiez-Entrepuentes

== Cerro-Amate ==
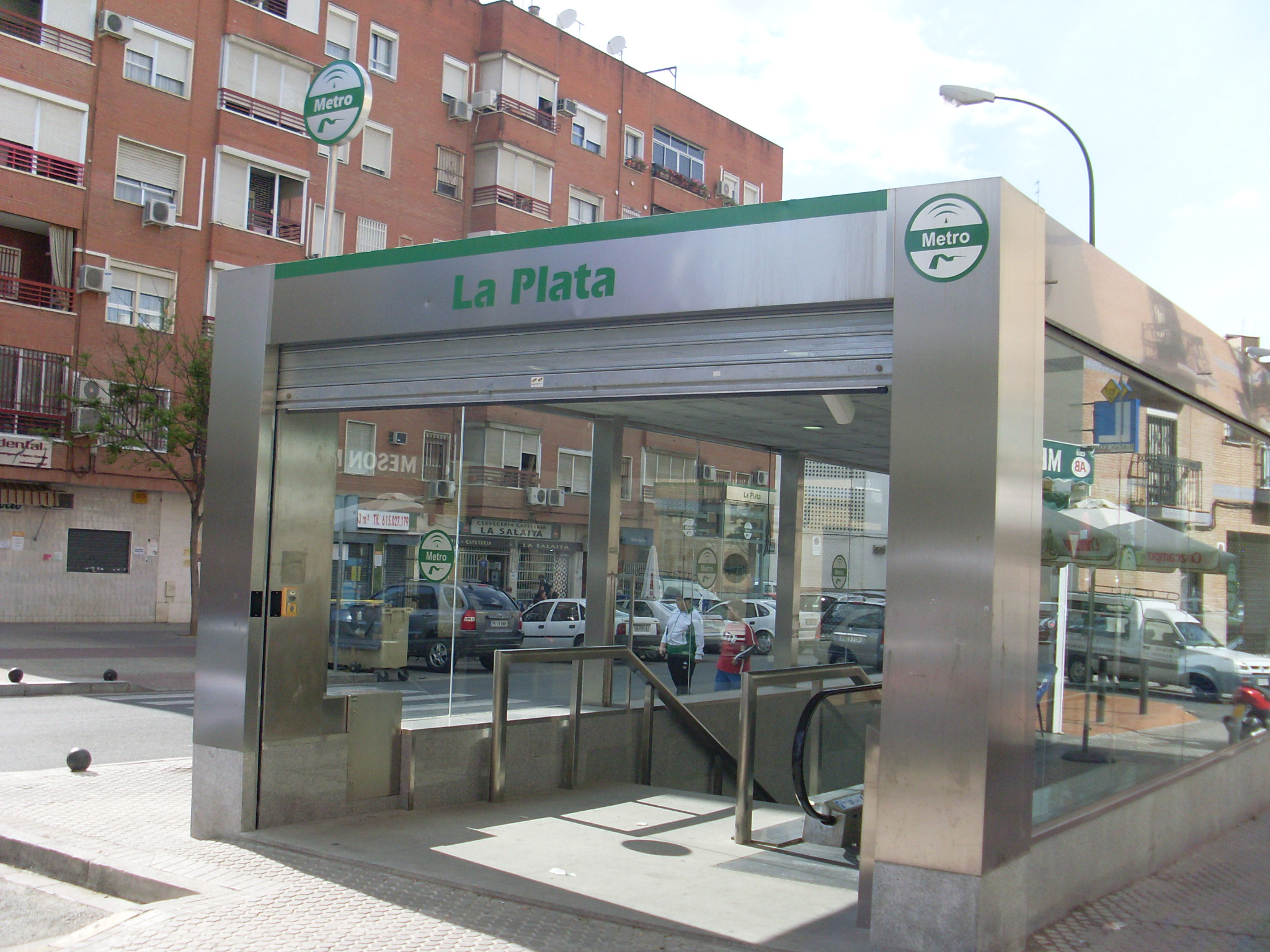
Seville Metro, La Plata station in Cerro-Amate.

Attractions: Amate Park and Amate Sports Center.

Neighborhoods:

- Amate
- Juan XXIII
- Los Pájaros
- Rochelambert
- Santa Aurelia-Cantábrico-Atlántico-La Romería
- Palmete
- El Cerro
- La Plata.

== Bellavista-La Palmera ==
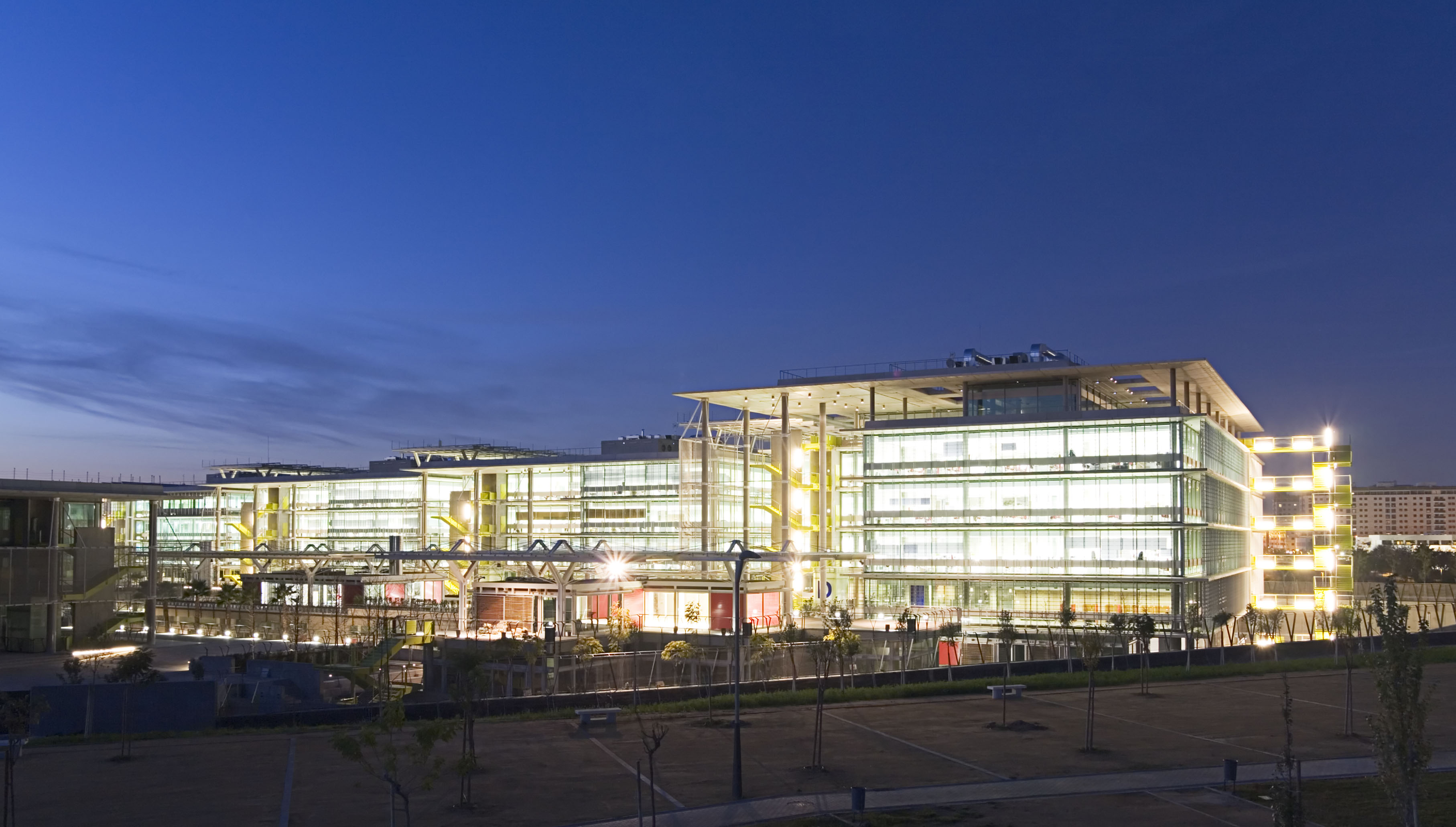
Palmas Altas Campus, Abengoa’s headquarters, in Bellavista-La Palmera

The majority of Bellavista-La Palmera lies in the far south of the city on the eastern bank of the Guadalquivir, opposite the Los Remedios district on the far south of the Isla de La Cartuja. The neighbourhood of Bellavista, lies on the eastern bank of the river Guadaira, a tributary which joins the Guadalquivir soon after. It was bought off the neighbouring city of Dos Hermanas.

Real Betis, a professional association football club, play in the Estadio Benito Villamarín in this district.

Neighbourhoods:

- Bellavista
- Heliópolis
- Elcano-Los Bermejales
- Sector Sur-La Palmera-Reina Mercedes
- Pedro Salvador-Las Palmeritas
- Barriada de Pineda

== San Pablo-Santa Justa ==
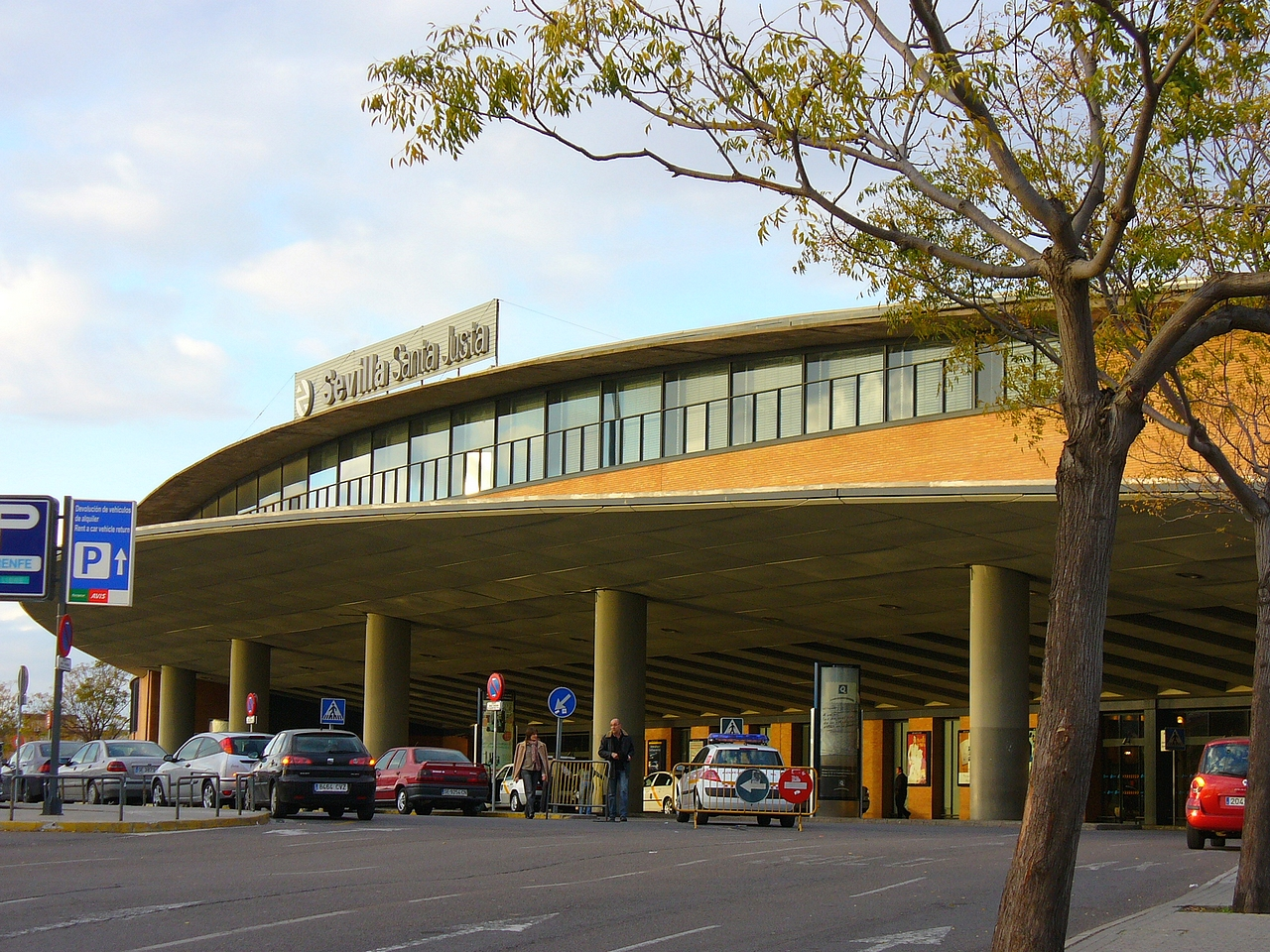
Santa Justa Station in San Pablo-Santa Justa

Attractions: The Sports Palace of Seville and Kansas City Avenue.

Neighbourhoods:

- Árbol Gordo
- La Corza
- Las Huertas
- San Carlos-Tartessos
- San José Obrero
- El Fontanal-María
- Auxiliadora-Carretera de Carmona
- Santa Clara
- Zodiaco
- San Pablo A y B
- San Pablo C
- San Pablo D y E
- Huerta de Santa Teresa
