= Macarena, Seville =

District of Seville, Andalusia, Spain

Coordinates: 37°24′15″N 5°59′25″W

Macarena is one of the eleven districts into which the city of Seville, capital of the autonomous community of Andalucía, Spain, is divided for administrative purposes. It is located in the north of the city, bordered to the south by the Casco Antiguo and San Pablo-Santa Justa suburbs, to the east and north by Norte and to the west by Triana. It covers the area between the Guadalquivir River and the Carmona Highway and from the SE-30 ring-road in the north to the Ronda del Casco Antiguo. It contains smaller neighbourhoods such as León XIII, Miraflores, and the Polígono Norte as well as the Miraflores park along the SE-30. The district contains the Andalucian Parliament (former Hospital de las Cinco Llagas), the Torre de los Perdigones in the park of the same name, and the Hospital Universitario Virgen Macarena.

Fray Diego street

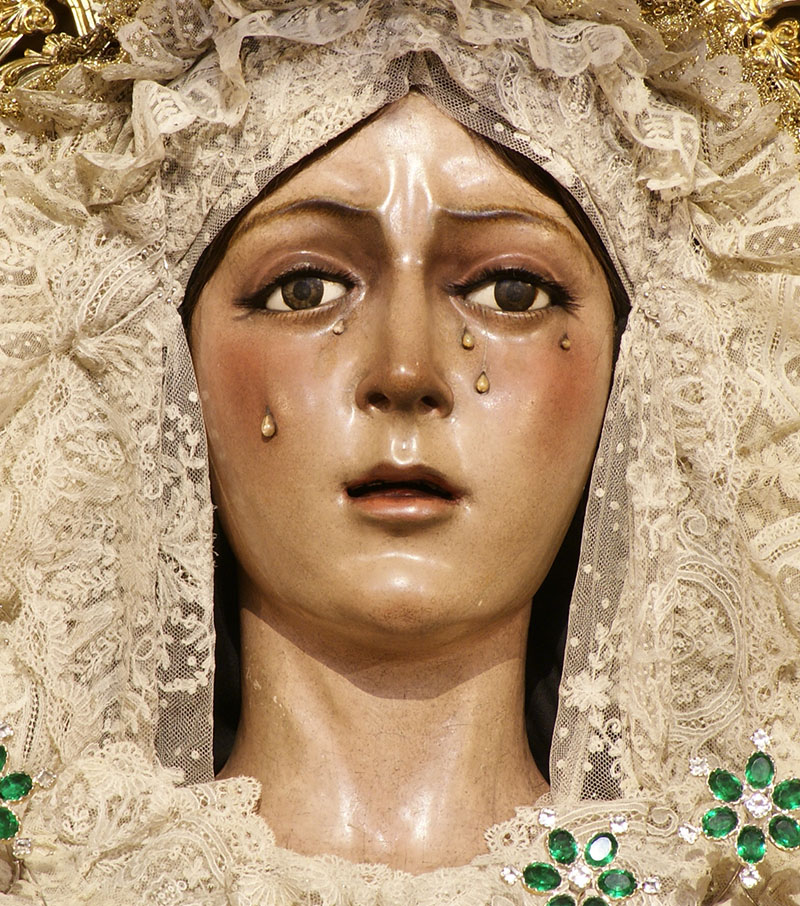
The famed Virgin of Hope of Macarena in close-up detail

== Etymology of the toponym Macarena ==
The origin of the toponym Macarena is disputed. While some authorities think that it is derived from Arabic, others maintain that it is from Latin. If it is from Latin, Macarena would be derived from the male name Macarius. It is supposed that a patrician named Macarius would have been an important Roman landowner in this area. Alternatively, it is known that during Muslim rule, the still existing city-wall gate Puerta de la Macarena was named Bab-al-Makrin, which could be related with to the current denomination Macarena.

The neighbourhood of La Macarena lends its name to the sculpture of Virgin of Hope of Macarena, sometimes known simply as La Macarena. Many Sevillian women are named after this statue. This gave rise to the name of Los del Río's Spanish-language song "Macarena".

== Monuments and landmarks ==
The neighborhood is known for housing the Basilica of La Macarena, seat of the homonymous Holy Week brotherhood. The procession in the early morning of Good Friday is one of the largest, most popular, and fervent in the whole of Spain. The wooden statue of Our Lady of Hope Macarena dates from the 17th century. The Neobaroque Basilica was built by Aurelio Gómez Millán in the 20th century. Next to the church is placed the Museum and Treasure of La Macarena, where the huge artistic and sentimental patrimony of the brotherhood is exposed, working as a complete explanation about the famous Holy Week processions of Seville.

The largest remaining portion of the Almohad city walls is to be found in La Macarena neighbourhood. It spans two of the old city gates, from the monumental Puerta de la Macarena (Macarena gate) in the west, next to the Basilica, to the Puerta de Cordoba (Córdoba gate) in the east, and annex to San Hermenegildo church.

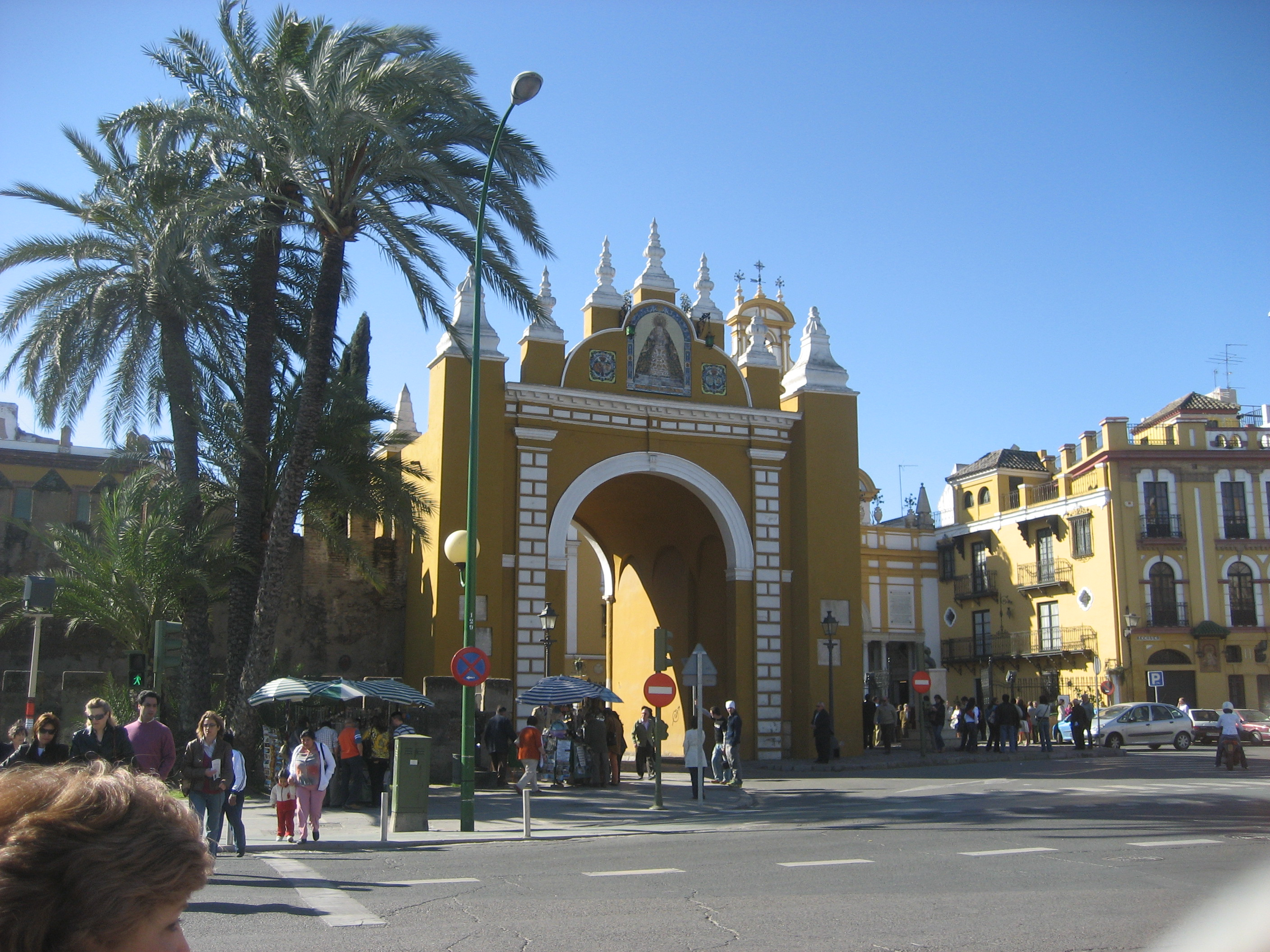
Macarena gate

The Parliament of Andalusia is housed in the old building of the Hospital de las Cinco Llagas (literally, Hospital of the Five Holy Wounds). Dated from 16th century, it is one of the best examples of Andalusian Mannerism.

The Torre de los Perdigones (literally, Tower of the Pellets), placed in Los Perdigones gardens next to the Guadalquivir river, is the last remain of a foundry building from the late 19th century. Since 2007 it contains a panoramic room-sized camera obscura.

In the nearby Feria street is located the oldest marketplace of Seville, the Mercado de la Feria. The building dates from 18th century and the greengrocer's, butcher's and fishmonger's stalls constitute a traditional and picturesque scene of Seville daily life.

== Transport ==
One can get to and from La Macarena by bus. The TUSSAM C3/C4 lines are circular, running clockwise and counter clockwise all along the periphery of the historical center, and have many stops in the neighborhood. Lines C1/C2 are also circular, and connect La Macarena with outer neighbourhoods, such as Nervión, La Cartuja and Los Remedios.

== Gallery ==
Hotel Macarena

Hall of the Basilica of Our Lady of Hope Macarena

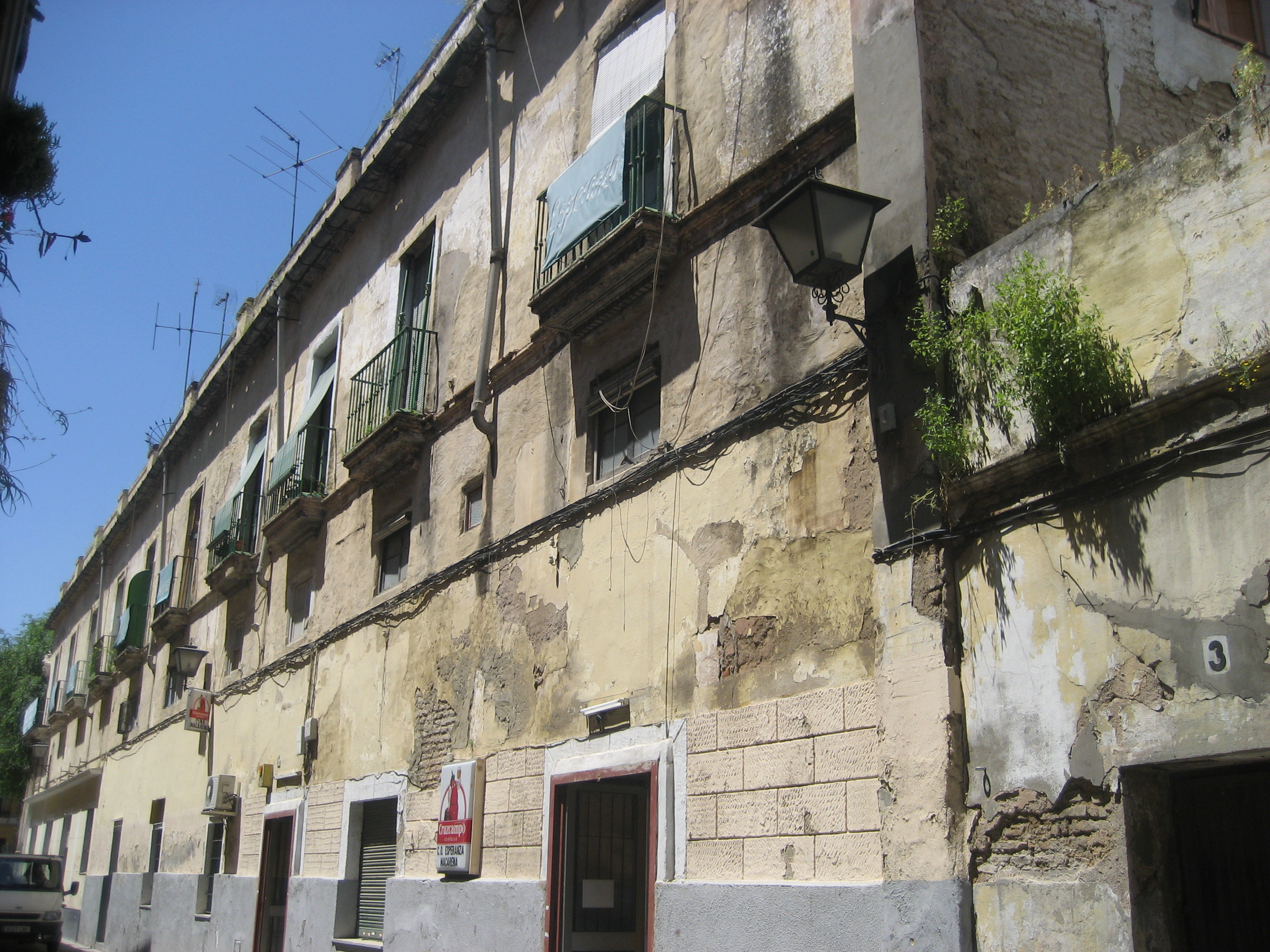
Pumarejo Palace

La Ronda

Florencio Quintero street

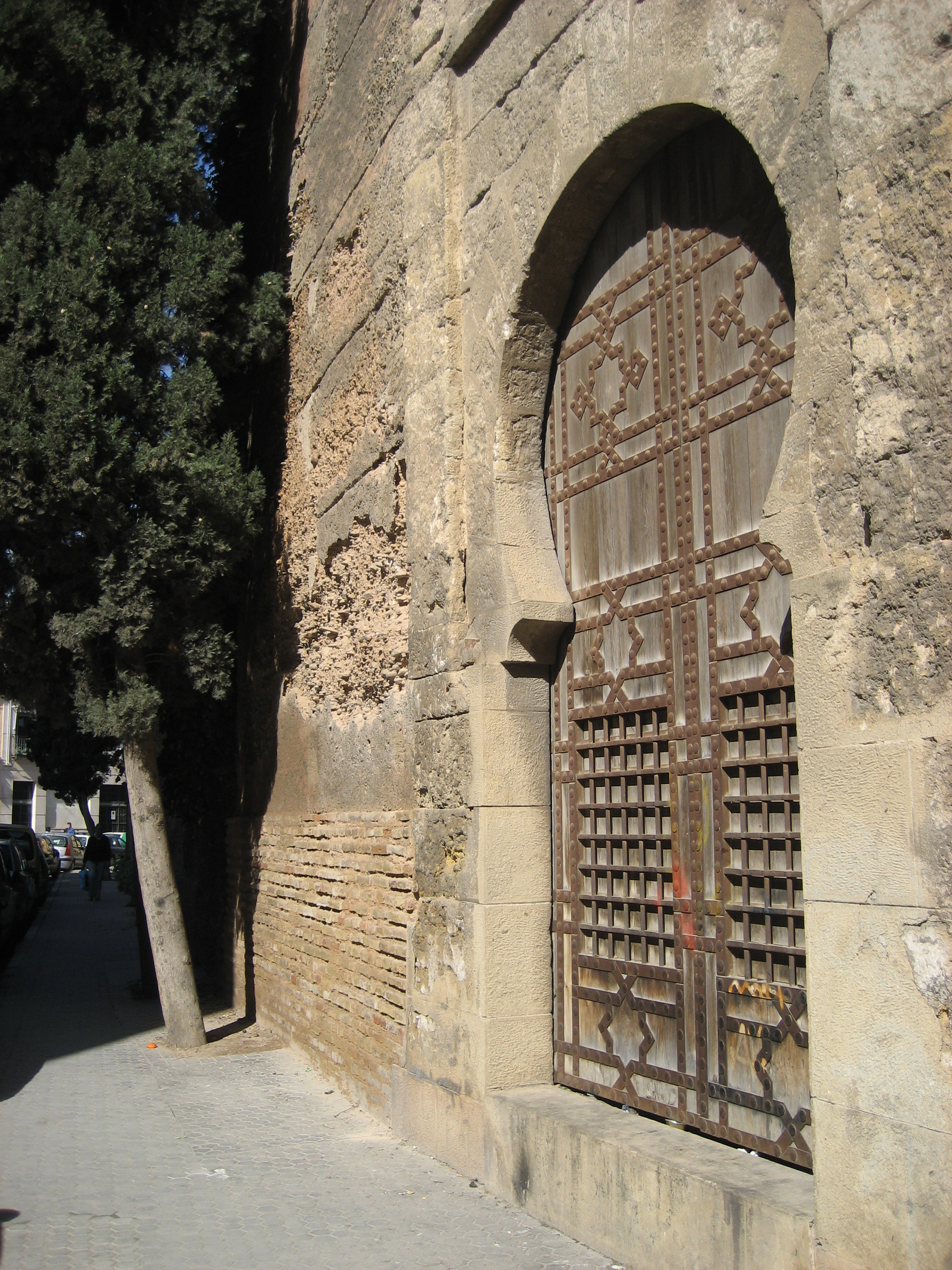
Córdoba Gate

Relator street

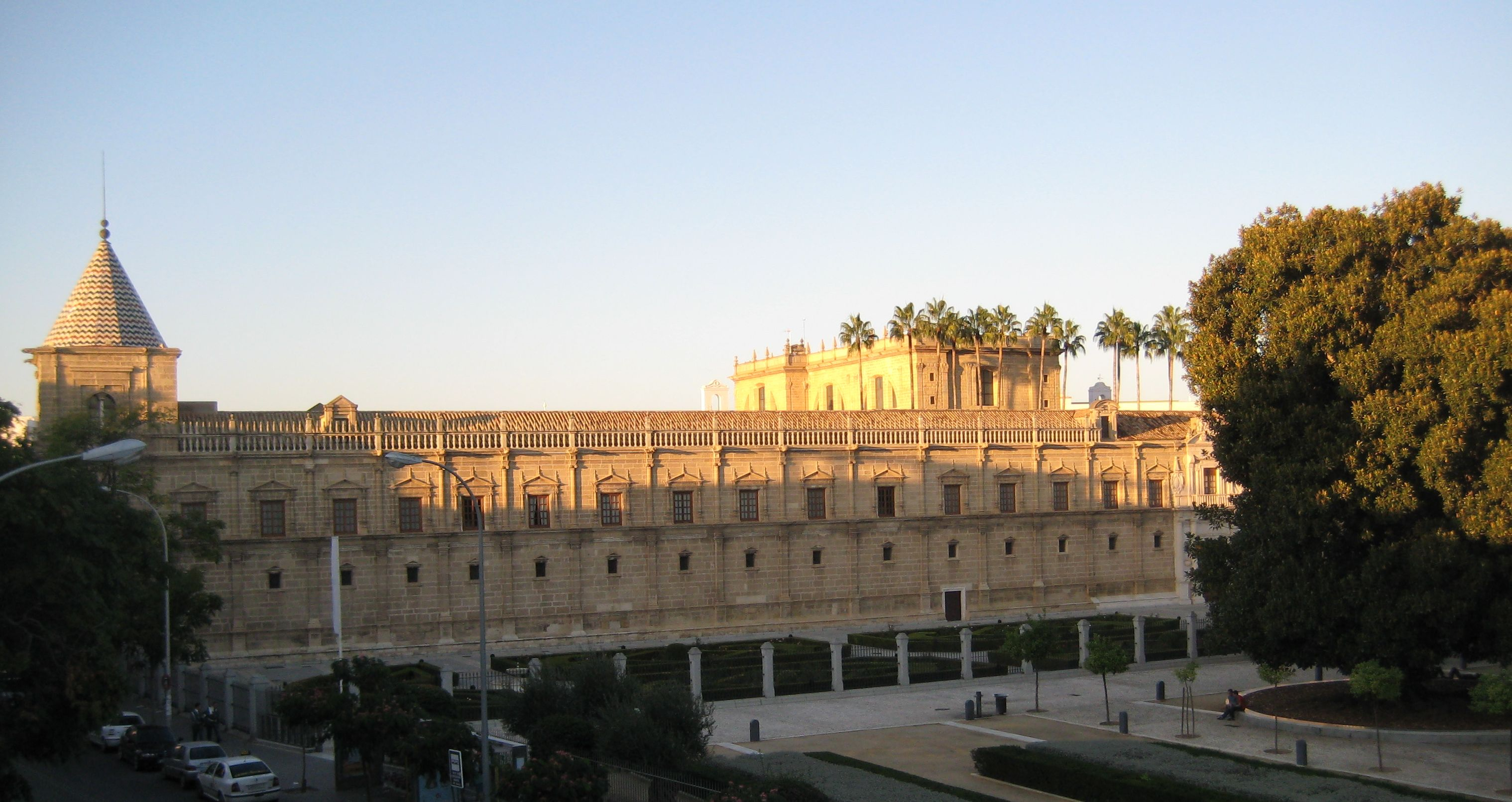
Hospital de Las Cinco Llagas

City Wall
