= El Arenal, Seville =

Coordinates: 37°23′01″N 5°59′47″W

El Arenal
- City neighborhood
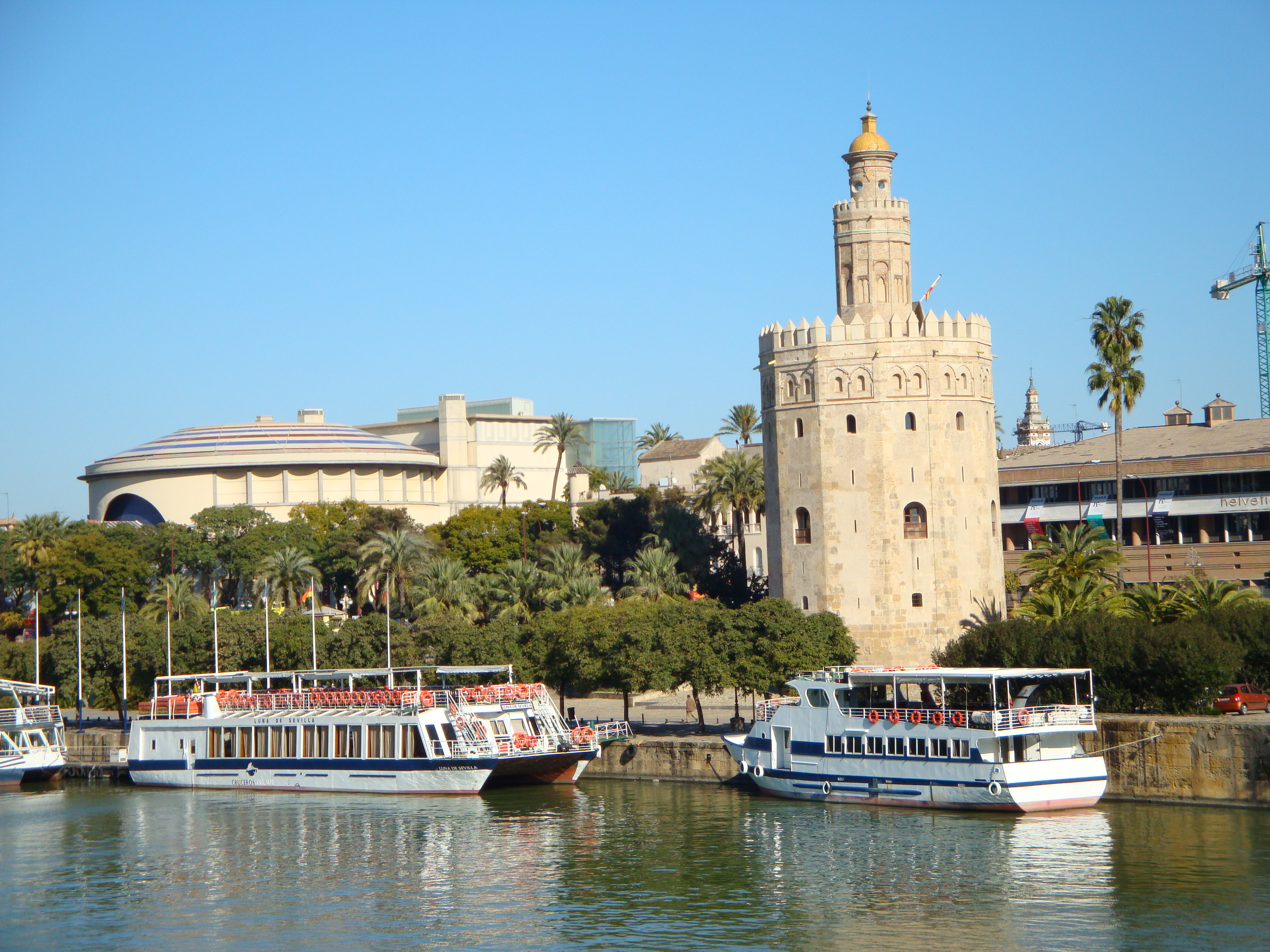
- The Torre del Oro and the Teatro de la Maestranza in El Arenal.

- Country: Spain
- Region: Andalusia
- Municipality: Seville
- District: Casco Antiguo

Population (2010)
  - Total: 3,798

El Arenal is a neighbourhood in the historical centre of Seville, the Casco Antiguo. It lies on the east bank of the Guadalquivir river to the west of the old Jewish Quarter, Santa Cruz, and south of the neighbourhoods of Museo and Alfalfa. Its name comes from the sandy nature that this east bank of the river once used to have. El Arenal has a history characterised by its former position as the port of Seville, until river silting forced the city to relocate the port to the southern edge of the city in the 17th century.

In the 16th century, the district called El Compás de Arenal, El Compás, or El Arenal was smaller than that of today and lay between the city walls and the river between the Puerta del Arenal, and the Puerta del Triana gates. A low-lying, sandy area, it was the main home of the Sevillan underworld, and the site of the notorious brothel, El Compás from where the other part of its name derived.

Some of the historical sites in the current neighbourhood are:

- The Torre del Oro, 13th Century Moorish watchtower
- The Reales Atarazanas, the Royal Shipyards
- La Real Maestranza, Seville's bullring and the second most important in Spain, after the Plaza de "Las Ventas" in Madrid
