= Casco Antiguo =

City centre district of Seville, Spain

Coordinates: 37°23′36″N 5°59′40″W

Location of the Casco Antiguo (red) in Seville (yellow).

The Casco Antiguo (Spanish for Ancient District) is the city centre district of Seville, the capital of the Spanish region of Andalusia. The Casco Antiguo comprises Seville's old town, which lies on the east bank of the Guadalquivir river. It borders the districts of Macarena to the north, Nervión and San Pablo-Santa Justa to the east, and the Distrito Sur to the south. Bridges across the Guadalquivir link the Casco Antiguo to Los Remedios, Triana and La Cartuja.

== Buildings ==
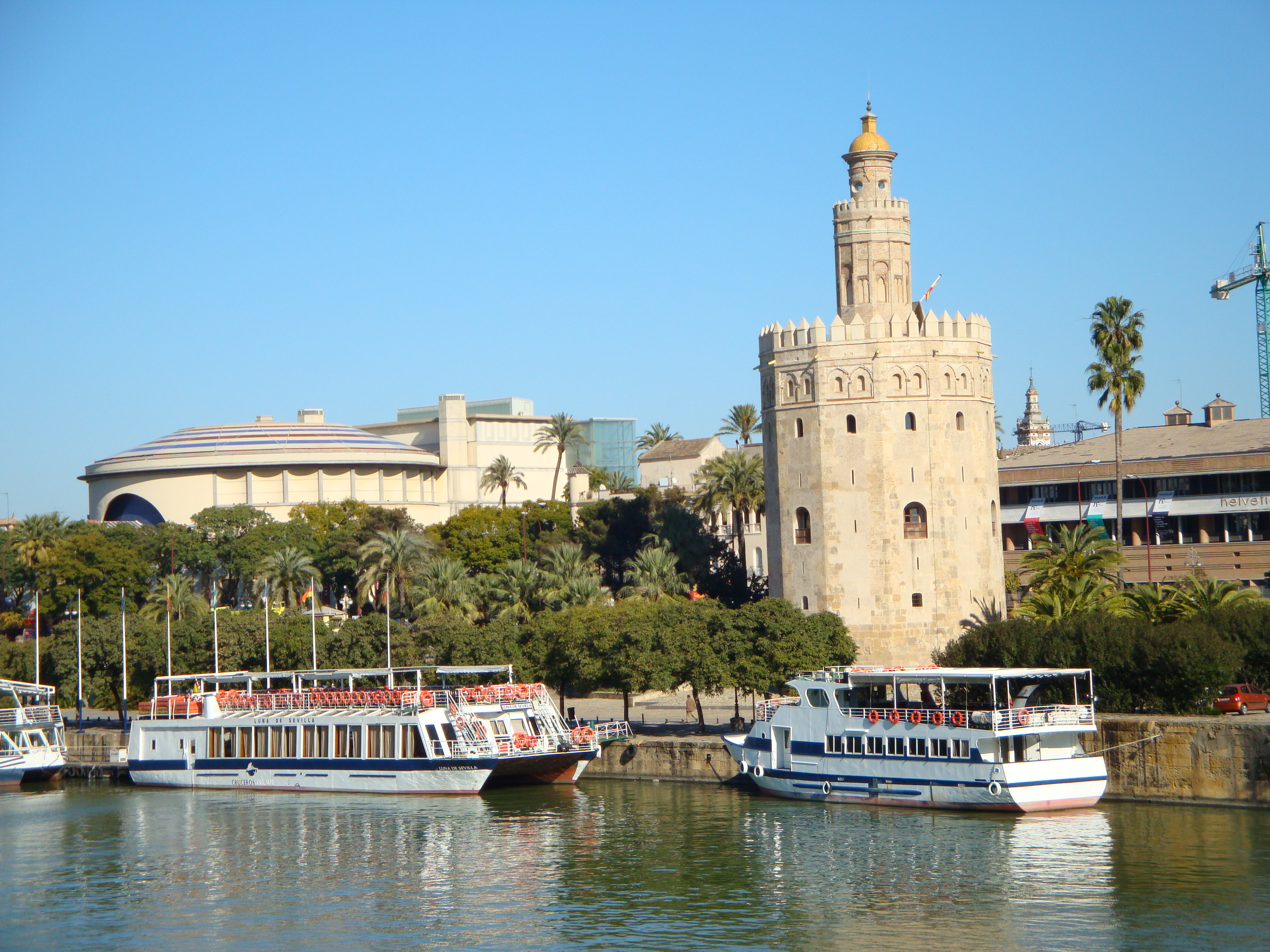
The Torre del Oro and the Teatro de la Maestranza are in the El Arenal neighbourhood of the Casco Antiguo.

There are three UNESCO World Heritage Sites in the district: the Cathedral of Seville, the Alcazar and the Archivo General de Indias. The Gothic Cathedral was built in 1403 on the site of a former mosque of which the Almohad minaret, the Giralda, was retained as a bell tower. It is the largest Gothic building in Europe and houses the tomb of Christopher Columbus. The Alcázar, built by the Moors in 712, was converted into a Christian royal residence in 1248. The Archive of the Indies was designed as a trade exchange of American treasures by Juan de Herrera under the orders of King Philip II of Spain. It was never used in that role and in 1784 King Charles III of Spain decided to store all documents relating to the conquest of the Americas.

Other buildings in the district include the Torre del Oro, the City Hall, the Palace of San Telmo, and the Metropol Parasol. The University of Seville is mainly based in the former Royal Tobacco Factory in the south of the Casco Antiguo, the setting to the story and opera Carmen. The city's bullring is in El Arenal.

== Neighbourhoods ==
Map of the neighbourhoods of the Casco Antiguo.

It has twelve neighbourhoods. Of these, El Arenal on the riverfront was the port of Seville until the Guadalquivir silted up in the 17th century, while the neighbouring Santa Cruz neighbourhood was a Jewish quarter until the Spanish Inquisition.

- Alfalfa
- Arenal
- Encarnación-Regina
- Feria
- Museo
- San Bartolomé
- San Julián
- San Gil
- San Lorenzo
- San Vicente
- Santa Catalina
- Santa Cruz
