= Santa Cruz, Seville =

Neighborhood of Seville, Spain

Coordinates: 37°23′06″N 5°59′25″W

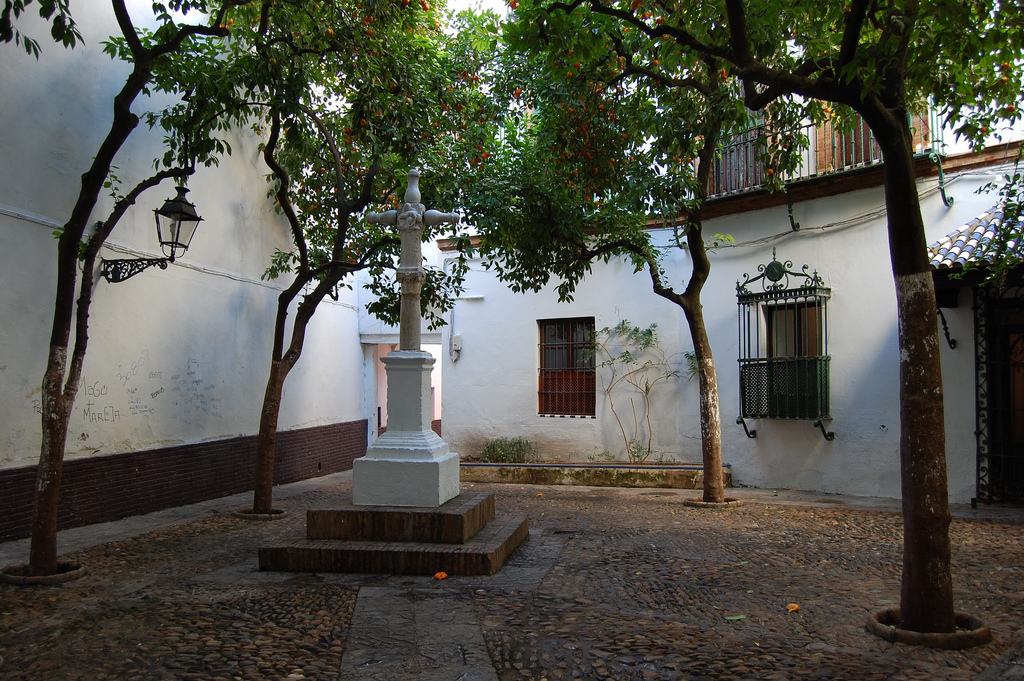
Plaza de Santa Marta

Santa Cruz is the primary tourist neighborhood of Seville, Spain, and the former Jewish quarter of the medieval city. Santa Cruz is bordered by the Jardines de Murillo, the Real Alcázar, Calle Mateos Gago, and Calle Santa María La Blanca/San José. The neighbourhood is the location of many of Seville's oldest churches and is home to the Cathedral of Seville, including the converted minaret of the old Moorish mosque Giralda.

== History ==
Santa Cruz was Seville's old judería (Jewish quarter): when Ferdinand III of Castile conquered the city from Muslim rule, he concentrated the city's Jewish population—second in the Iberian Peninsula only to that of Toledo—in this single neighborhood. After the Alhambra Decree of 1492 expelled the Jews from Spain, the neighborhood went into decline. In the 18th century, the neighborhood underwent a major process of urban renewal, including the conversion of a former synagogue into the current Church of Saint Bartholomew.

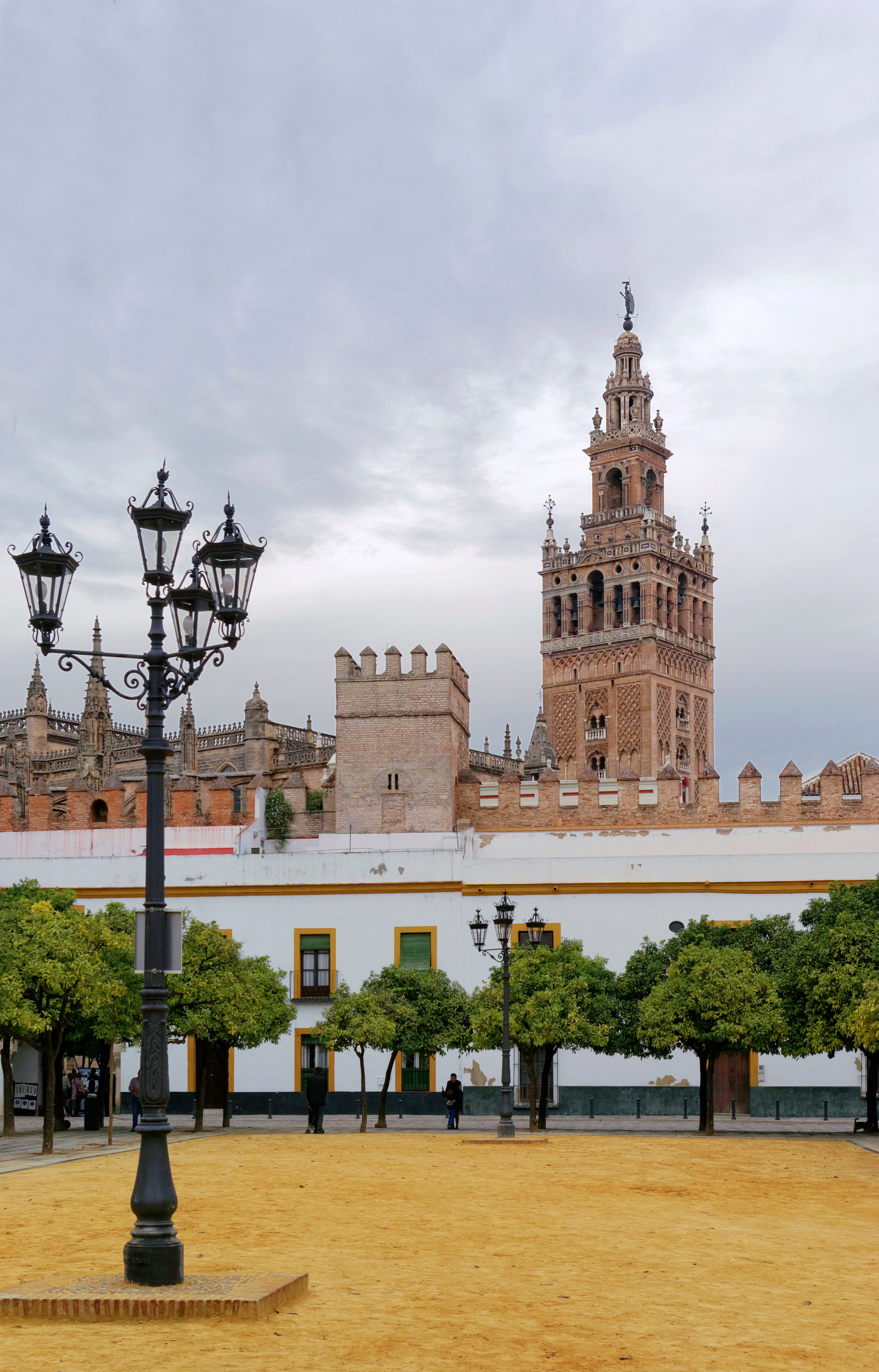
Patio de Banderas

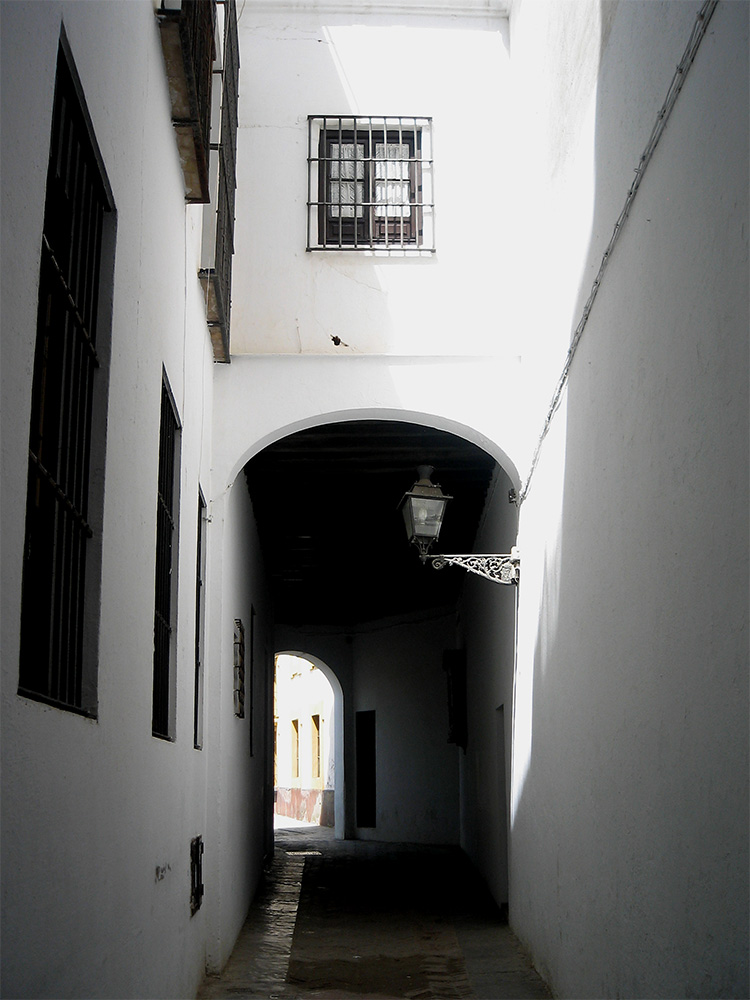
Street dating from the old judería.

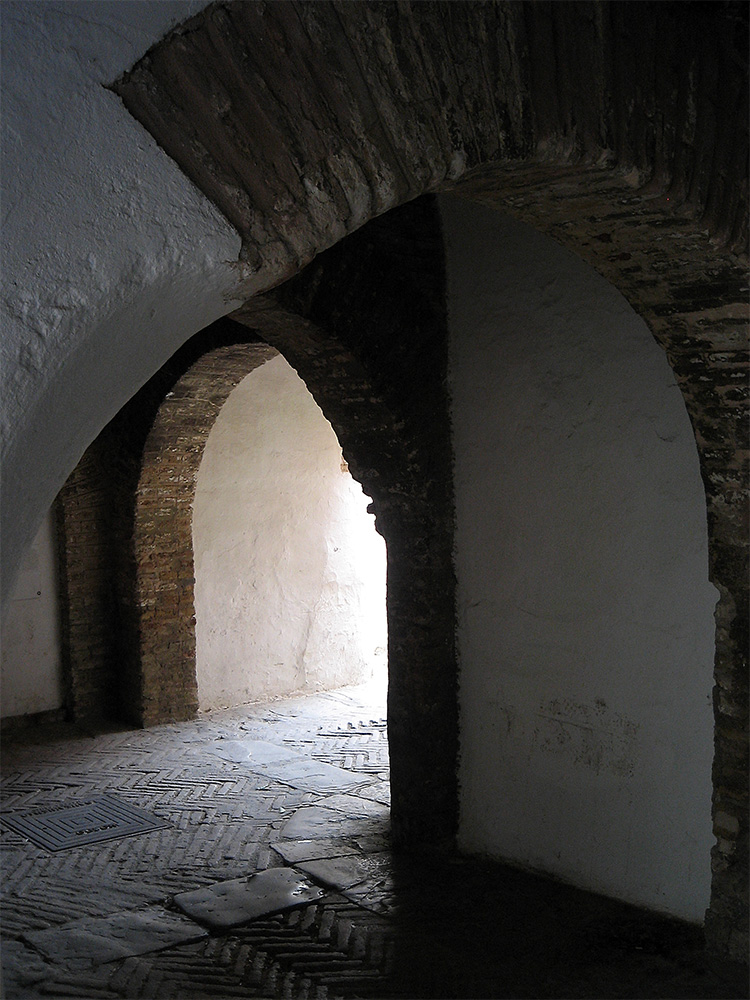
Street dating from the old judería.

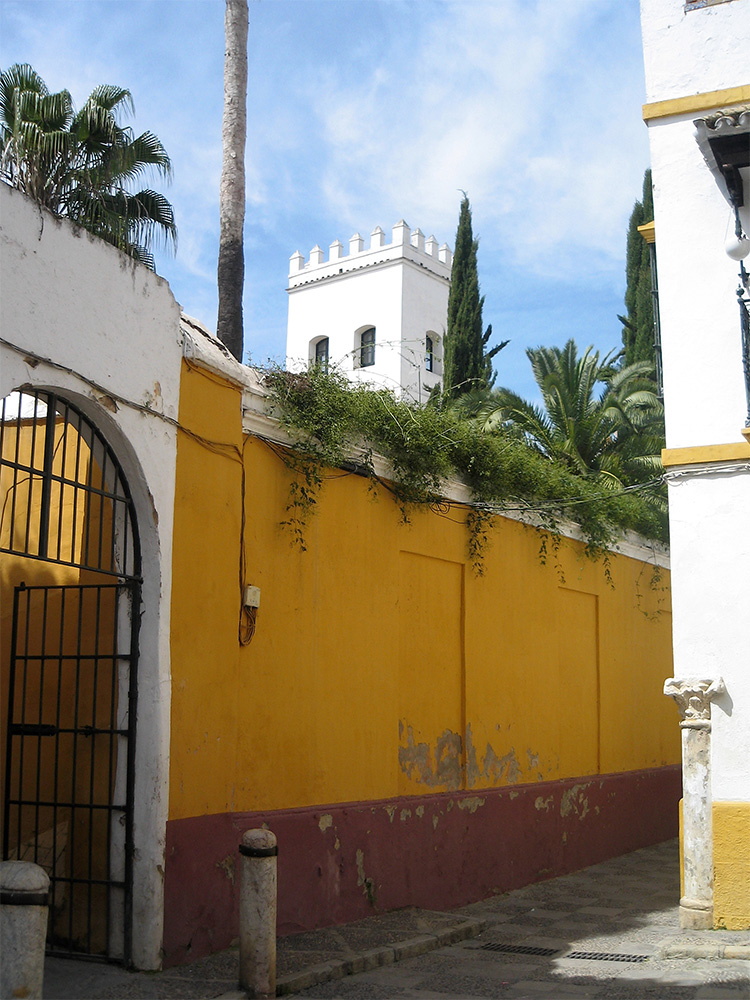
Street dating from the old judería.

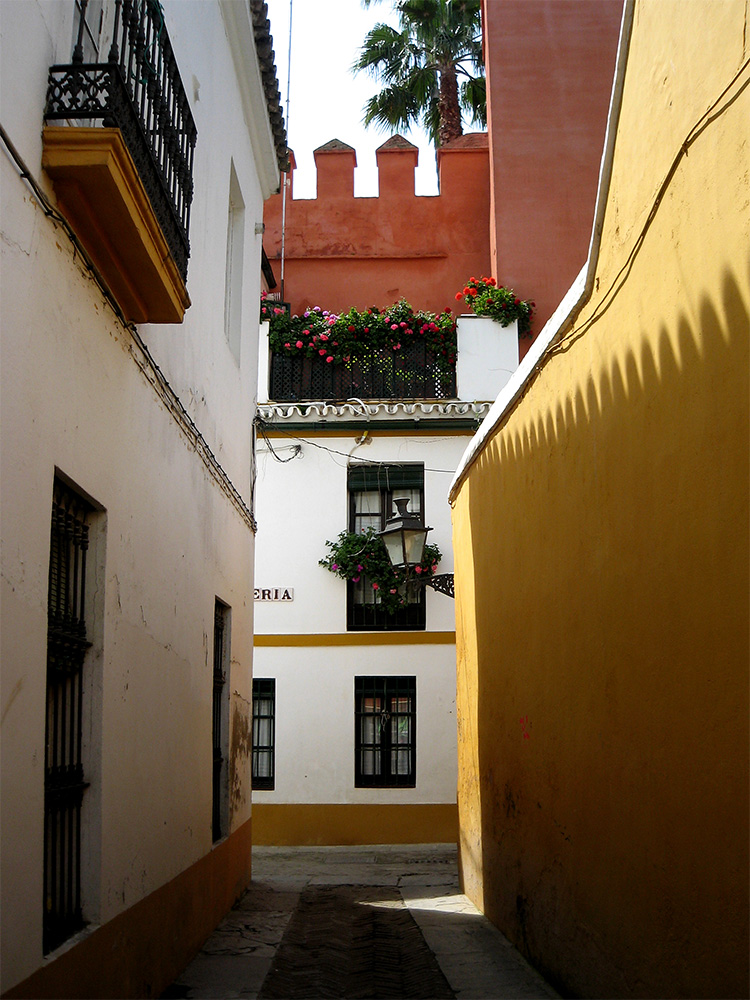
Street dating from the old judería.

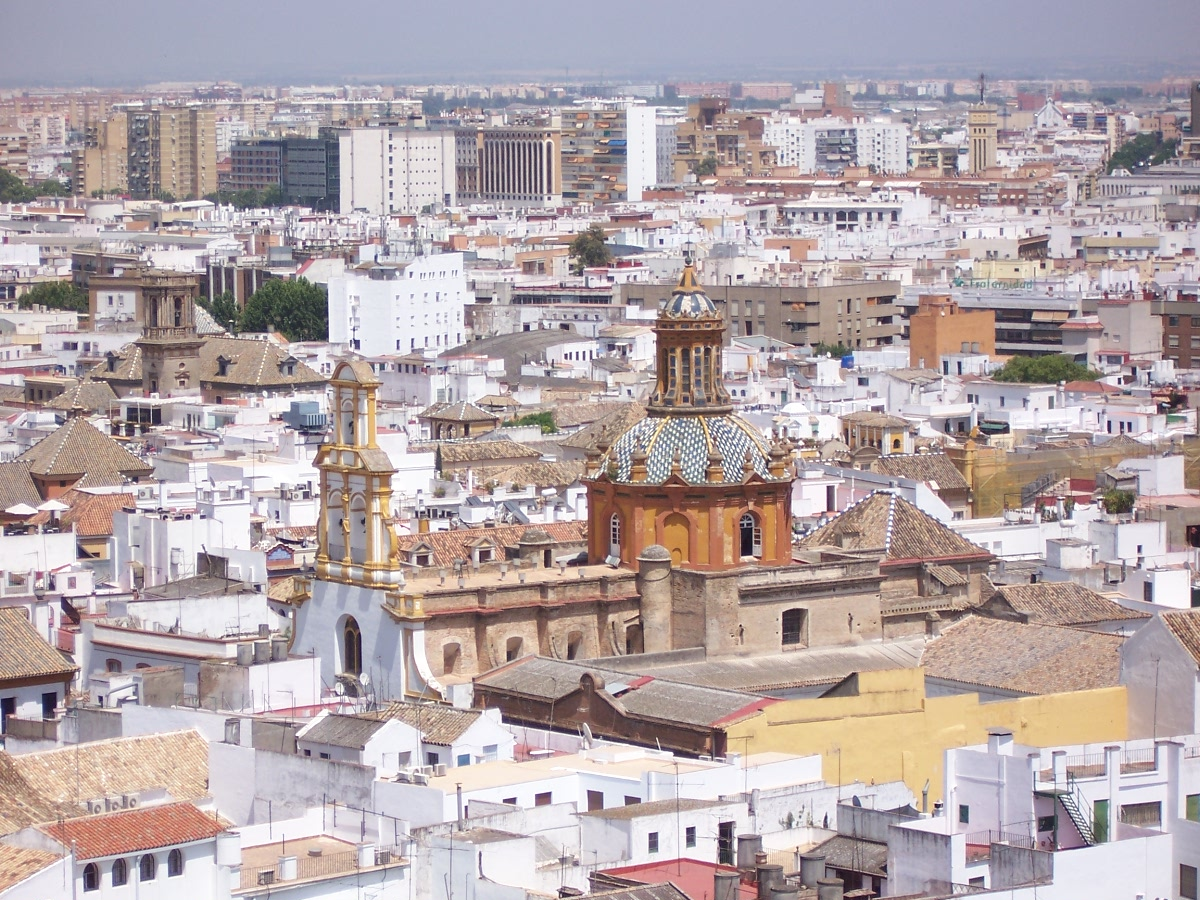
Iglesia de Santa Cruz, seen from the Giralda.

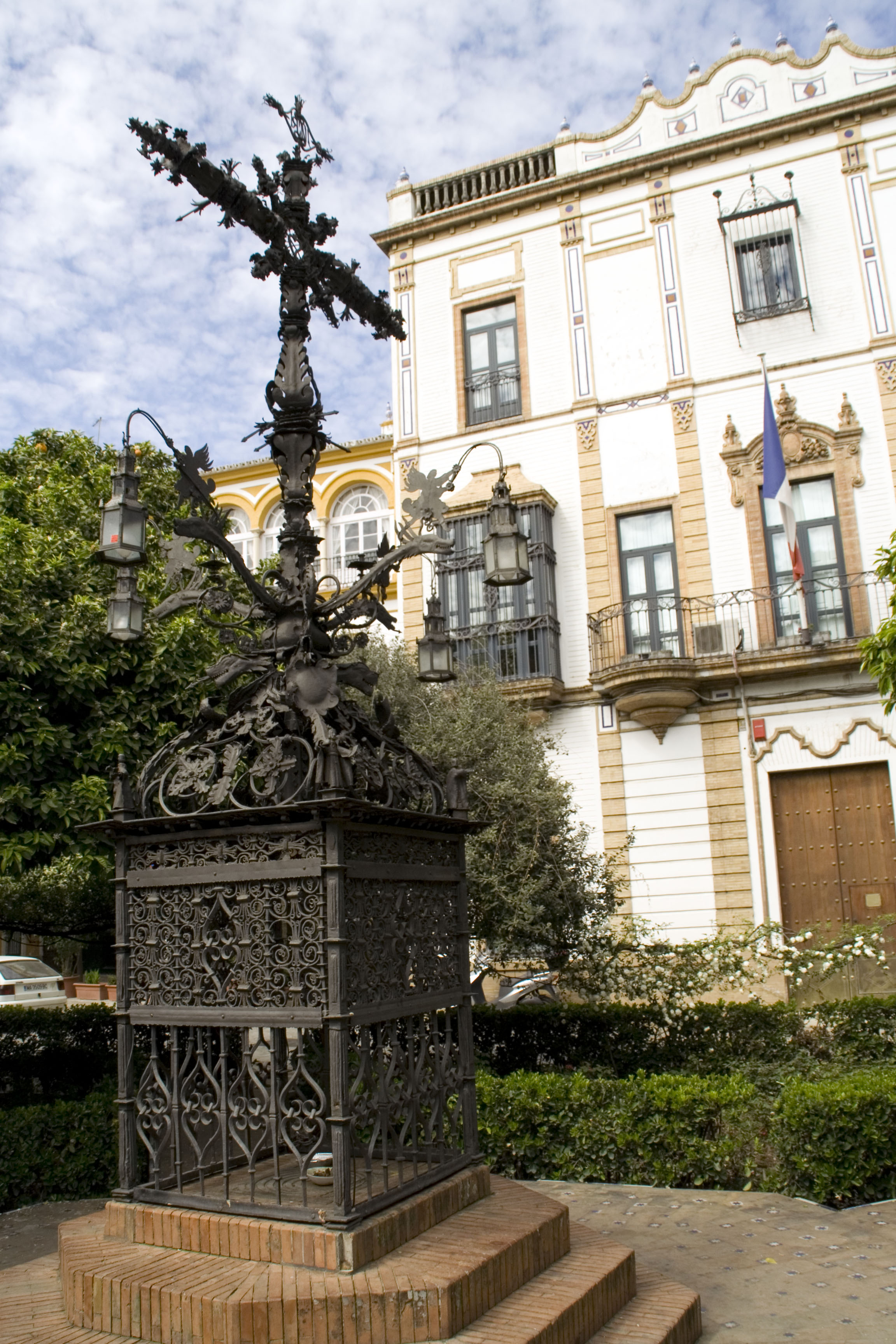
Plaza de Santa Cruz. Detail of the Cruz de la Cerrajería ("Locksmith's Cross").

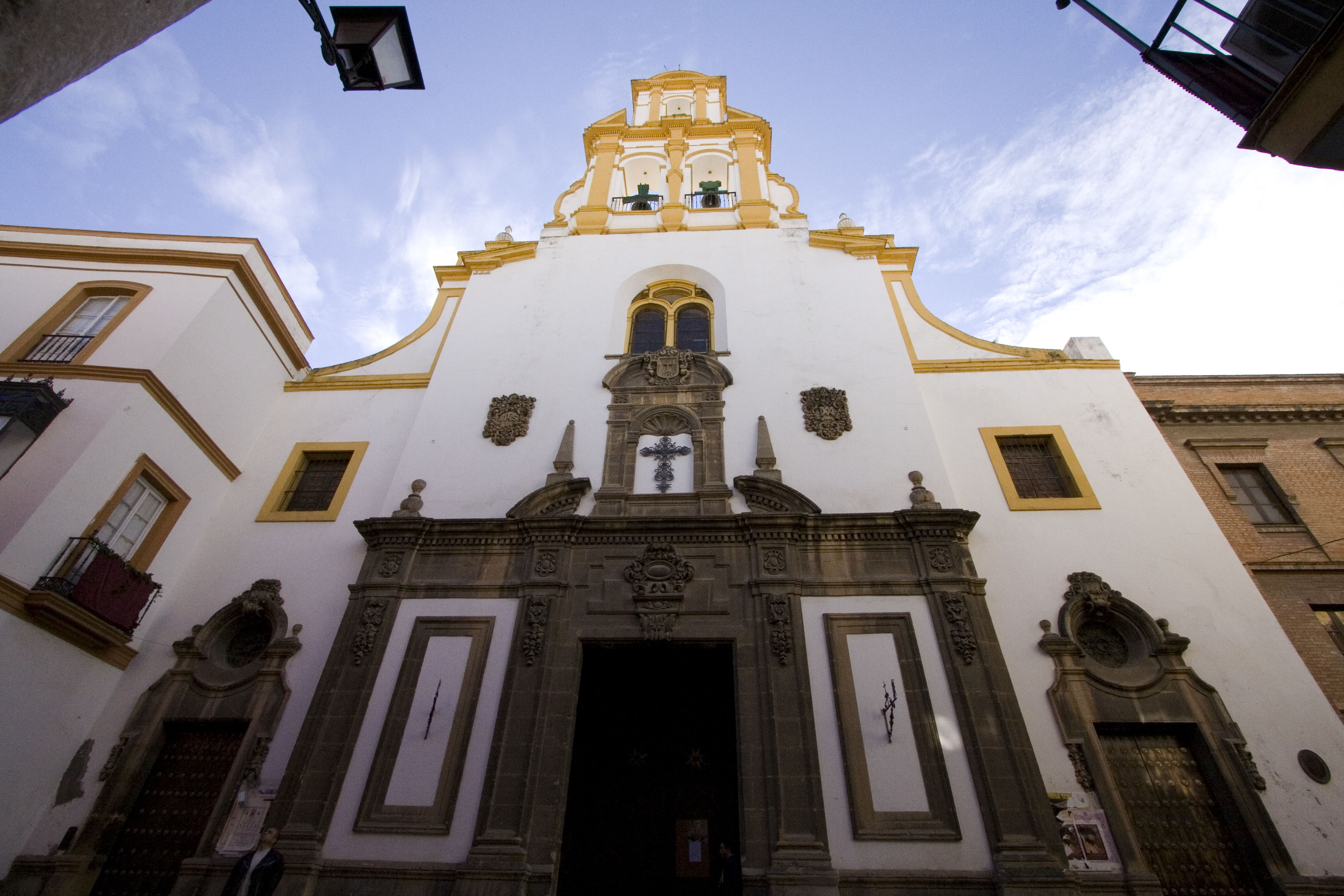
Façade of the Iglesia de Santa Cruz in Calle Mateos Gago.

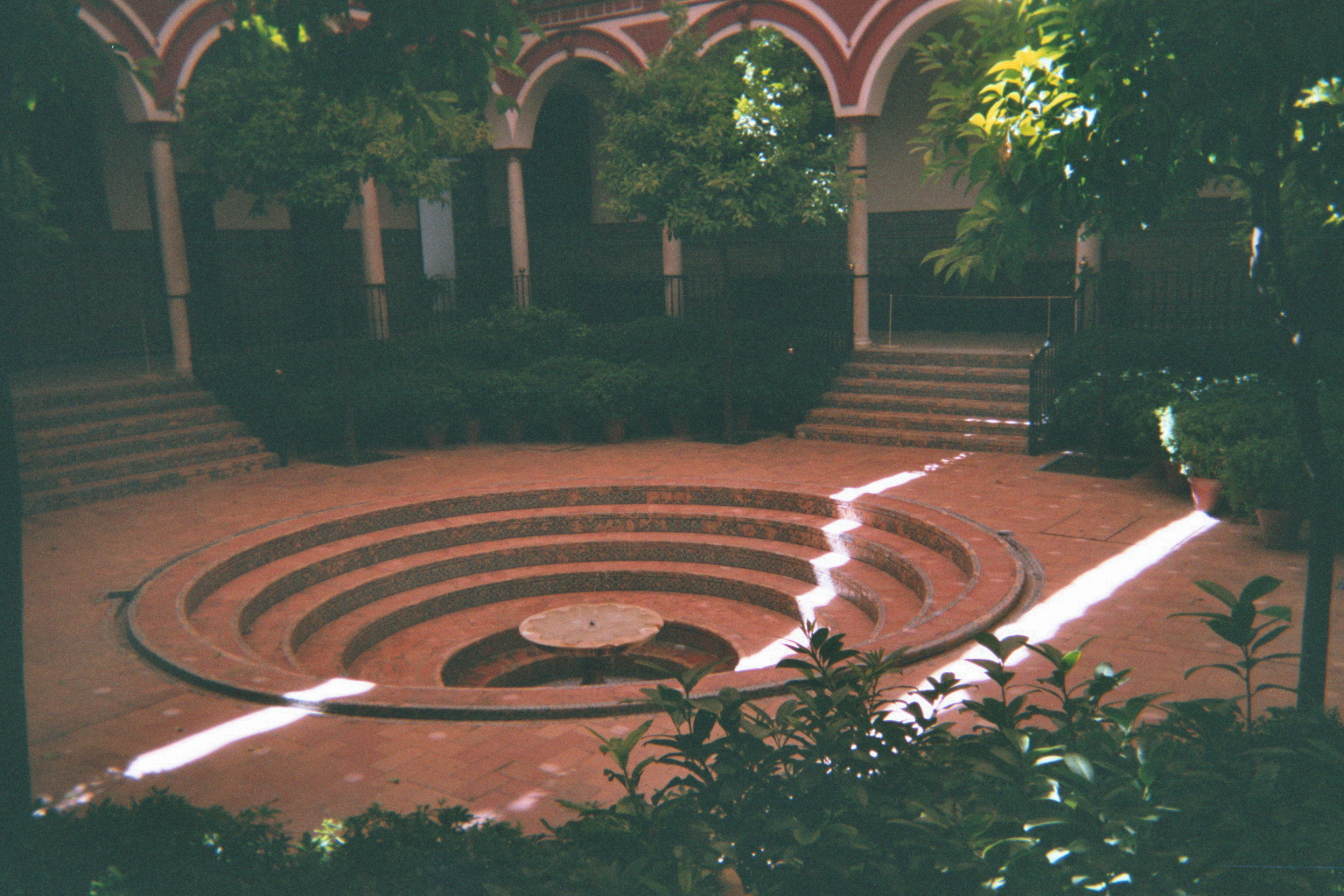
Patio of the Hospital de los Venerables.

Just outside the neighborhood is the Iglesia de Santa María de las Nieves ("Church of Saint Mary of the Snows"), better known as the Iglesia de Santa María la Blanca ("Saint Mary the White"), a converted 14th century Mudéjar synagogue.

== Origin of the name ==
The present-day Plaza de Santa Cruz was once the site of the Iglesia de Santa Cruz (Church of the Holy Cross), a parish church that gave its name to the neighborhood. The church in Mudéjar style was constructed over the ruins of a synagogue, incorporating the floor of that older building. During the Napoleonic Wars the church was demolished as part of an urban renewal scheme, the old floor remained as the present plaza. The parish was moved to the monastery of the Clérigos del Espíritu Santo ("clerics of the Holy Spirit"), now the current Iglesia de Santa Cruz in Calle Mateos Gago (Mateos Gago Street). The present church houses a painting of the Last Supper by 17th century painter (and Santa Cruz resident) Bartolomé Esteban Murillo; Murillo was buried in the demolished parish church where the plaza now stands.
