= Clemente Hidalgo (Seville Metro) =

General information
- Location: Carretera Amarilla, Cerro-Amate, Seville; Andalusia, Spain
- Platforms: 2 Side platform, 65 m long, with platform screen doors
- Tracks: 2
- Connections: Bus: 2, 5, 24, 52

Construction
- Structure type: Underground
- Depth: 20 m (66 ft)
- Accessible: Yes

Other information
- Fare zone: 1

History
- Opened: By ?

Clemente Hidalgo will be an interchange station between metro services of Seville subway system, Andalusia. The station will be located in the intersection of Ronda del Tamarguillo Av. and Federico Mayo Av. It will be an underground interchange station between the lines 1 and 4. Construction work will begin in late 2011, and the station is expected to be operational during ??.

== Future services ==
Metro service at this station
<< Toward	< Preceding	Line	Following >	Toward >>
Ciudad Expo	Gran Plaza		1º de Mayo	Olivar de Quintos
Circle line	Ramón y Cajal		Carretera Amarilla	Circle line

== See also ==
- List of Seville metro stations
