= San Juan Bajo (Seville Metro) =

Seville Metro station

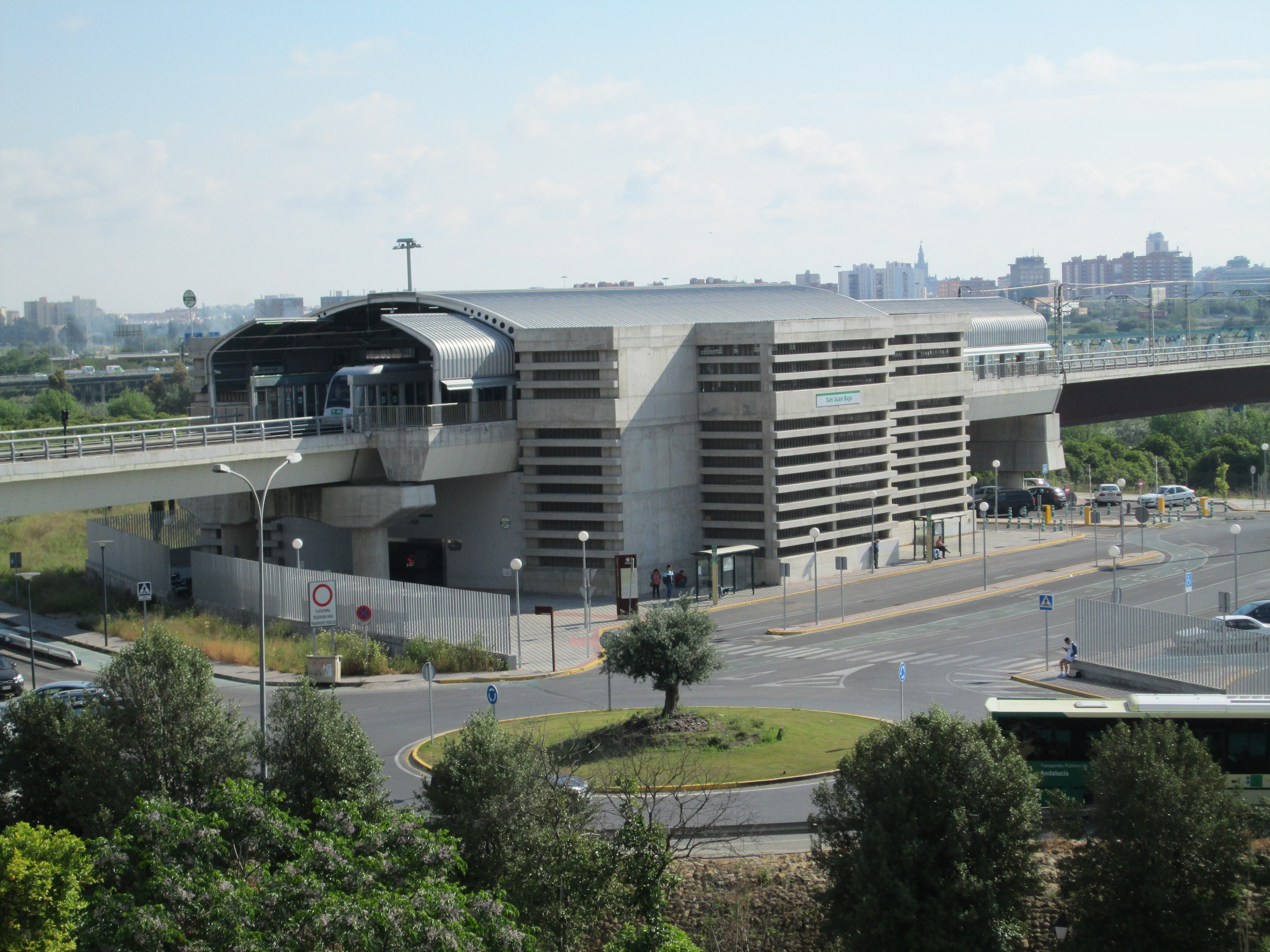

General information
- Location: Av. Blas Infante, Barrio Bajo, San Juan de Aznalfarache, Andalusia; Spain
- Coordinates: 37°22′01″N 6°01′31″W
- Platforms: 2 Side platforms, 65 m long, with platform screen doors
- Tracks: 2

Construction
- Structure type: Elevated
- Depth: 7 m (23 ft)
- Parking: Yes
- Cycle facilities: Yes
- Accessible: Yes

Other information
- Fare zone

History
- Opened: 2 April 2009; 17 years ago

Services
Preceding station	Seville Metro	Following station
San Juan Alto towards Ciudad Expo	Line 1	Blas Infante towards Olivar de Quintos
Location

San Juan Bajo is a station on line of the Seville Metro, located within the municipality of San Juan de Aznalfarache, specifically in the Barrio Bajo district. It is the first (or last) station within this municipality and is situated beneath the Sagrado Corazón (Sacred Heart Monument). It was opened on April 2, 2009.

== Location and structure ==
The station is built on a viaduct designed to span the Guadalquivir River. It features a single access point, including static and escalator staircases, as well as elevators for accessibility. The station consists of a covered surface-level concourse and an elevated platform above the viaduct.

Adjacent to the station, there is a parking facility, and a panoramic elevator connects the station with the Aljarafe escarpment and the Sacred Heart Monastery.

== Platform and safety features ==
San Juan Bajo has side platforms with separate accesses and platform screen doors to prevent falls onto the tracks. It is also equipped with emergency evacuation systems to ensure passenger safety.

== Similar stations ==
The station shares its design with Pablo de Olavide station, along Condequinto as all three are the only elevated stations on line 1 of the Seville Metro.

== Connections ==
Bus: M-101, M-140, M-141, M-150, M-151, M-152, M-153, M-154A, M-154B, M-155

== See also ==
- List of Seville metro stations
