= San Juan Alto (Seville Metro) =

Seville Metro station

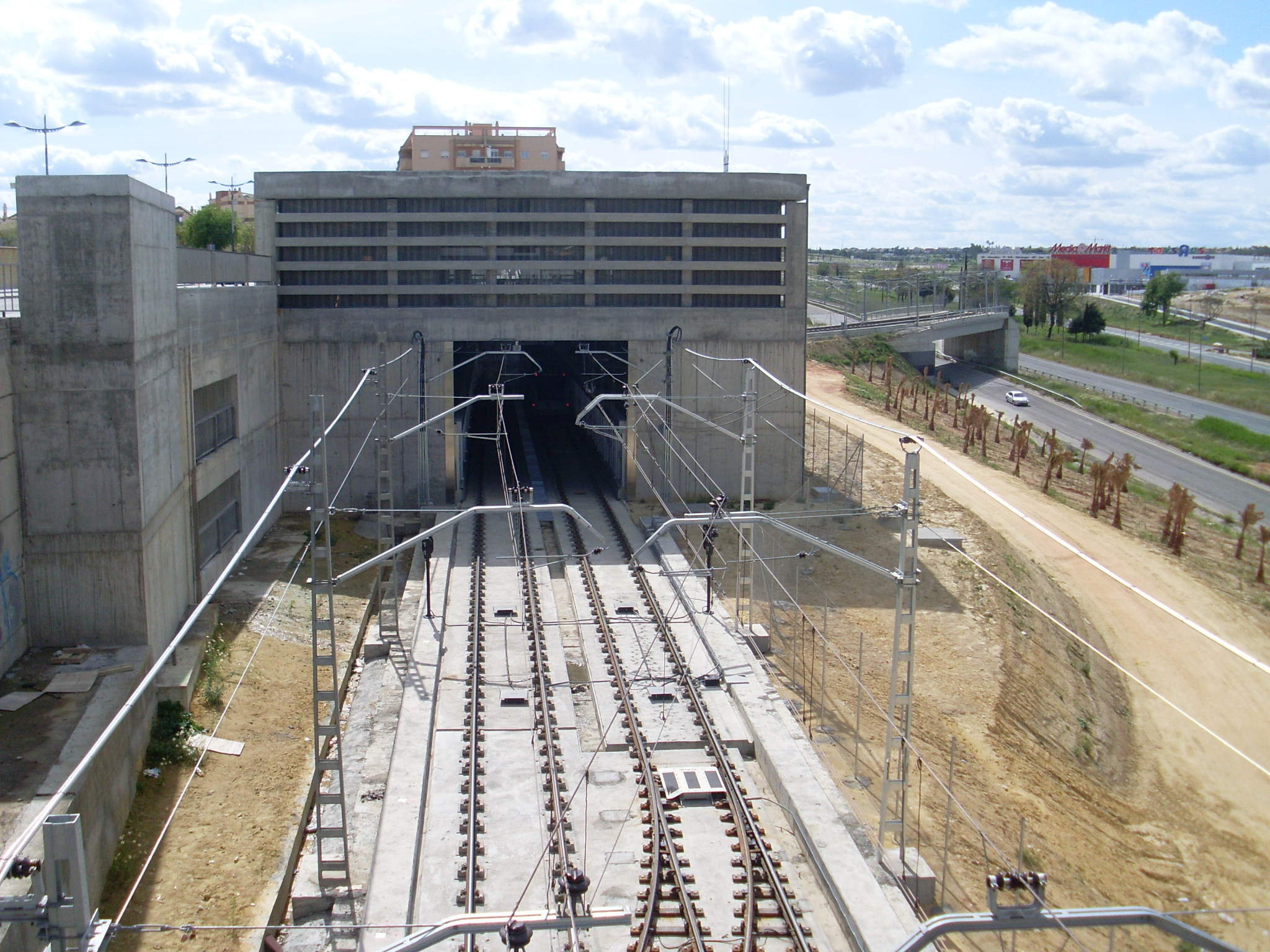

General information
- Location: Clara Campoamor, Barrio Alto, San Juan de Aznalfarache; Andalusia, Spain
- Coordinates: 37°21′42″N 6°02′18″W
- Platforms: 2 Side platforms, 65 m long, with platform screen doors
- Tracks: 2

Construction
- Accessible: Yes

Other information
- Fare zone: 0

History
- Opened: 2 April 2009; 17 years ago

Services
Preceding station	Seville Metro	Following station
Cavaleri towards Ciudad Expo	Line 1	San Juan Bajo towards Olivar de Quintos
Location

San Juan Alto (English: Saint John High) is a station of the Seville Metro on line 1 named after its location, in the neighborhood of the municipality of San Juan de Aznalfarache, Seville, Spain. It is located close to the A-8057 road and Clara Campoamor St. San Juan Alto is a semi-underground building between Cavaleri and San Juan Alto stations on the same line. It was opened on 2 April 2009.

== Connections ==
Bus: M-150, M-151, M-152, M-153, M-155

== See also ==
- List of Seville metro stations
