= Montequinto (Seville Metro) =

Seville Metro station

General information
- Location: Montequinto Av., Dos Hermanas; Andalusia, Spain
- Coordinates: 37°20′30″N 5°56′04″W
- Platforms: 1 Island platform, 65 m long, with platform screen doors
- Tracks: 2
- Connections: Bus: M-123, M-130

Construction
- Structure type: Underground
- Depth: 6 m (20 ft)
- Accessible: Yes

Other information
- Fare zone: 2

History
- Opened: 23 November 2009; 16 years ago

Services
Preceding station	Seville Metro	Following station
Condequinto towards Ciudad Expo	Line 1	Europa towards Olivar de Quintos
Location

Montequinto is a station of the Seville Metro on line 1 named after the neighborhood of Montequinto in the municipality Dos Hermanas, Seville. It is located in the instesection of Montequinto Av. and Ferrara St.. Montequinto is an underground type station situated between Condequinto and Europa on the same line. It was opened on 23 November 2009.

== See also ==
- List of Seville metro stations
