= Line 1 (Seville Metro) =

Metro line in Seville, Spain

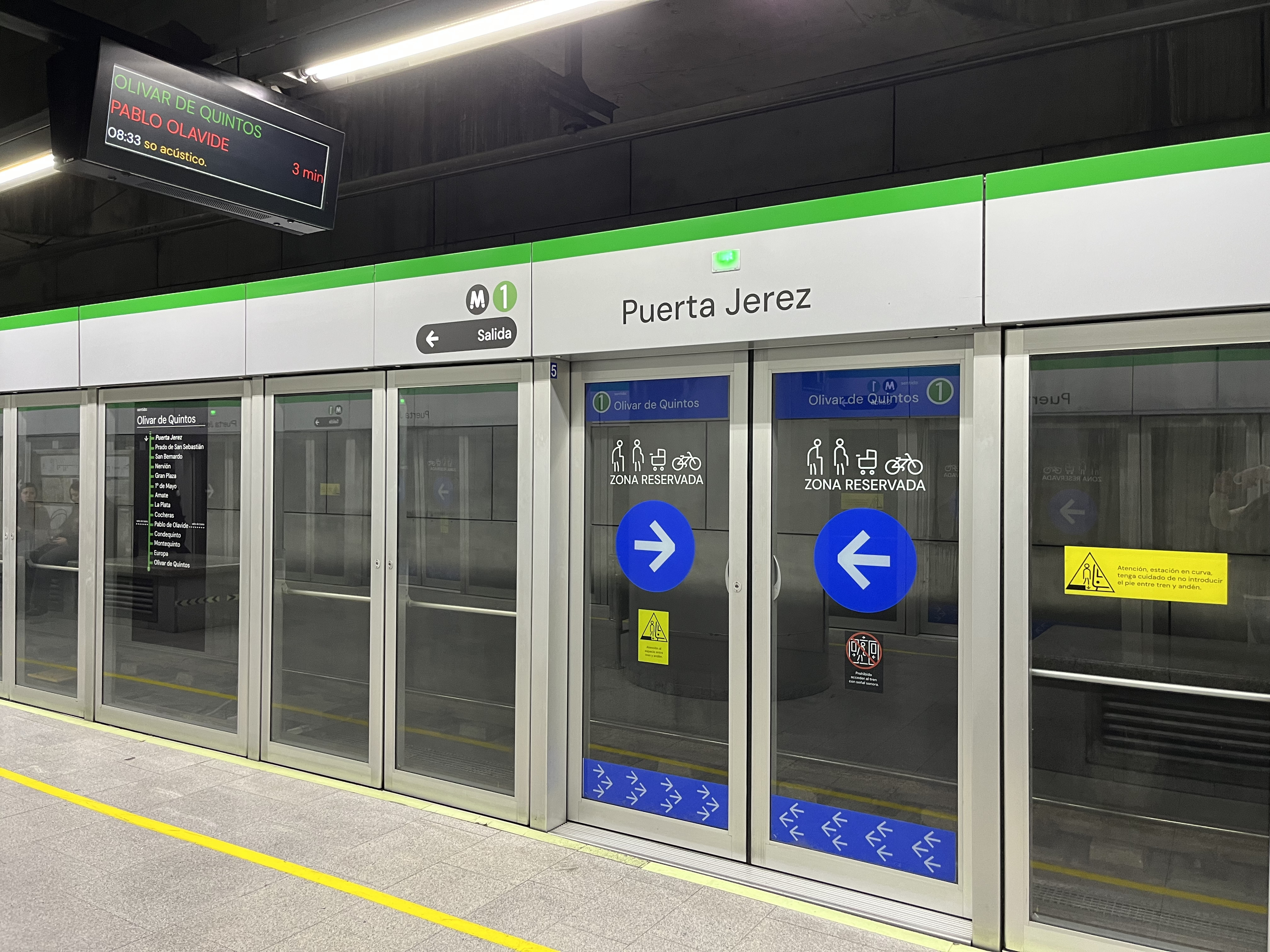
- Puerta Jerez station

Overview
- Status: In operation
- Owner: Junta de Andalucía
- Locale: Seville
- Stations: 21 (+1 planned)

Service
- Type: Rapid transit
- System: Seville Metro
- Operator(s): Ferroc. Junta de Andalucia and Globalvia
- Rolling stock: CAF Urbos 2

History
- Opened: 2 April 2009

Technical
- Track gauge: 1,435 mm (4 ft 8 1/2 in) standard gauge

Line 1 of the Seville Metro connects the capital, Seville, with Ciudad Expo (Mairena del Aljarafe), San Juan de Aznalfarache, and Quinto (Dos Hermanas).

== History ==
Line 1 of the Seville Metro is the only one among those approved by the Junta de Andalucía in the year 2000 that makes use of a significant portion of the infrastructure built during the 1970s and 1980s.

Specifically, this new project includes more than 5 km of tunnel running between the stations of Nervión and La Plata, as well as the stations located along this route: Nervión, Gran Plaza, 1.º de Mayo, Amate, and La Plata. Construction of the current line 1 began in the municipality of Mairena del Aljarafe and was later extended to the rest of the route.

In August 2005, the tunnel boring machine began operating, but due to setbacks caused by Seville's heterogeneous soil and delays in preliminary studies, it took more than a year and a half to complete the first 2.5 km tunnel between the stations of Parque de los Príncipes and San Bernardo. The second twin tunnel was completed in just over six months, on April 21, 2008.

== Description ==
Line 1 of the Seville Metro begins at Ciudad Expo in Mairena del Aljarafe, initially running underground through the neighborhood before reaching Cavaleri station. It then emerges above ground and continues toward the elevated section of San Juan de Aznalfarache, before descending back underground through the lower part of the neighborhood.

The line crosses the SE-30 highway via a viaduct and runs at ground level until it reaches Blas Infante station in Seville. From this point, it continues underground, serving the districts of Los Remedios (future connection with line), Prado de San Sebastián (future connection with line), and San Bernardo, which offers an interchange with suburban train services. It then proceeds through Nervión, 1.º de Mayo (future connection with line 4), Parque Amate, and Cocheras.

After Cocheras, the line resurfaces and once again crosses the SE-30 via a viaduct before arriving at Guadaíra station, currently out of service, which is planned to be an interchange with suburban trains. It continues above ground to Pablo de Olavide station and then crosses the Utrera highway via another viaduct before reaching Montequinto, a neighborhood with four metro stations. The final station in Montequinto serves as an interchange between the metro and bus networks.

Notably, line 1 does not have a direct connection with the future line of the Seville Metro.

== General characteristics ==
- Method of construction: Tunnel boring machine, cut and cover, and viaduct.
- Average depth: 16 metres (52 ft).
- Cost: Around €650 million.
- Municipalities served: Four.
- Districts spanned: Four.
- Population served: 227.974 approximately
- Annual users: 22.690.753 approximately (2024)
- Daily users: 61.997 approximately (2024)

== Operation ==
=== Schedules ===
The closing time corresponds to the departure of the last train beginning from any of the starting stations in order to proceed serving the people waiting in other stations along the line.

Timetable
Weekdays	Opening	Closing
From Monday to Thursday	6:30 h	23:00 h
Fridays and weekdays preceding non-working days	6:30 h	2:00 h
Saturdays	7:30 h	2:00 h
Sundays and non-working days	7:30 h	23:00 h
*Applicable since 2009

=== Segmentation ===
In line 1 of the metro of Seville, the various rates are established according to the number of segment transfers that the user requires in order to travel from the original station to the final one. For this reason, the line is subdivided zones with different rates, which generally correspond with the borders of the municipalities of Seville and the rest of the metropolitan area through which the line runs. The stations of Blas Infante and Pablo de Olavide serve as the two nexuses between the three zones, and as such, any user moving from a zone to one of these two points does not pay the segment transfer fee.

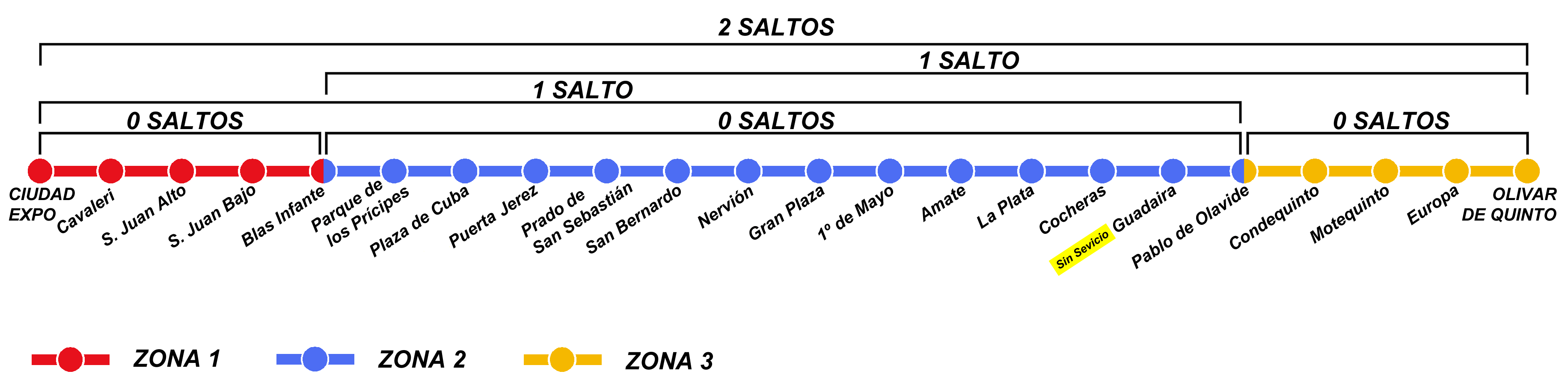
Distribution of segments

== Stations ==
Ciudad Expo - Olivar de Quintos
Municipality	District	Station	Opened	Zone	Connections
Mairena del Aljarafe	Ciudad Expo	Ciudad Expo	2009		M-101, M-150, M-151, M-152, M-153, M-155
Mairena del Aljarafe	Ciudad Expo	Cavaleri	2009		M-150, M-151, M-152, M-153, M-155
San Juan de Aznalfarache	Barrio Alto	San Juan Alto	2009		M-150, M-151, M-152, M-153, M-155
San Juan de Aznalfarache	Barrio Bajo	San Juan Bajo	2009		Panoramic elevator M-101, M-150, M-151, M-152, M-153, M-154A, M-154B, M-155
Seville	Los Remedios	Blas Infante	2009		41, A2; M-140, M-150, M-151, M-152, M-153, M-162
Seville	Los Remedios	Parque de los Príncipes	2009		5, 6, C1, C2; M-140, M-150, M-151, M-152, M-153, M-162
Seville	Los Remedios	Plaza de Cuba	2009		5, 40, A2; M-140, M-150, M-151, M-152, M-153
Seville	Casco Antiguo	Puerta Jerez	2009		T1 Metrocentro tram 3, 5, 21, 37, 40, 41, C3, C4, A2, EA; M-140, M-151, M-152, M-153
Seville	Casco Antiguo	Prado de San Sebastián	2009		(under construction); T1 Metrocentro tram 1, 21, 22, 25, 26, 28, 29, 30, 31, 34, 37, 38, C1, C2, C3, C4, EA, CJ, LE, LN, A5; M-121, M-122, M-123, M-130, M-131, M-132, M-132B, M-133, M-134, M-221
Seville	Nervión	San Bernardo	2009		T1 Metrocentro tram 22, 25, 26, 28, 29, 38, 52, B4, C1, C2, A5, EA, CJ, LE, LN; M-121, M-122, M-123, M-130
Seville	Nervión	Nervión	2009		T1 Metrocentro tram 5, 22, 28, 29, 32, 52, B3, B4, C1, C2, A4, EA; M-121
Seville	Nervión	Gran Plaza	2009		5, 22, 29, 32, 52, B3, B4, A4; M-121, M-122, M-221
Seville	Cerro-Amate	1.º de Mayo	2009		5, 24, 52
Seville	Cerro-Amate	Amate	2009		24, 25, 52
Seville	Cerro-Amate	La Plata	2009		25
Seville	Cerro-Amate	Cocheras	2009		26
Seville	Cerro-Amate	Pablo de Olavide	2009		TM Alcalá de Guadaíra tram (under construction); 38; M-123, M-130
Dos Hermanas	Quinto	Condequinto	2009		M-123, M-130
Dos Hermanas	Quinto	Montequinto	2009		M-130
Dos Hermanas	Quinto	Europa	2009		M-130
Dos Hermanas	Quinto	Olivar de Quintos	2009		M-130, M-133
