= Puerta Jerez (Seville Metro) =

Seville Metro station

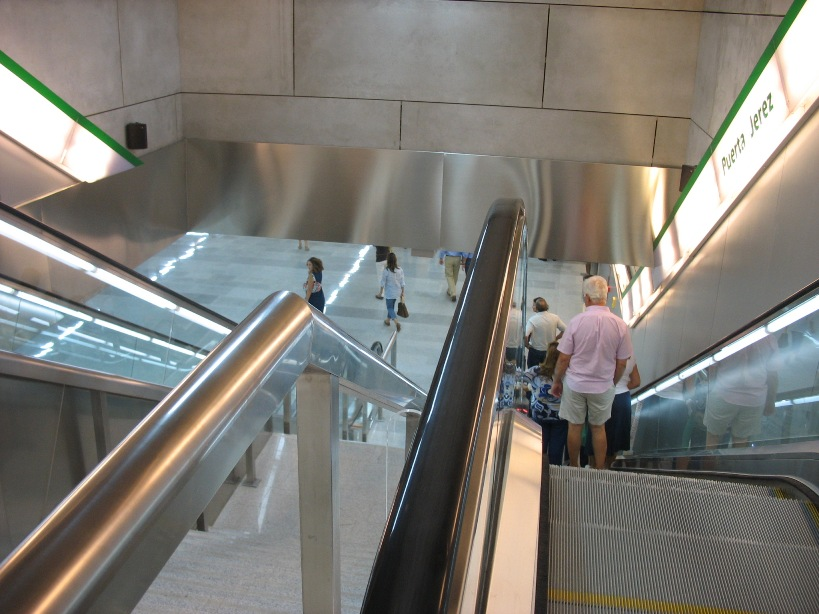

General information
- Location: Paseo de Cristina, Casco Antiguo, Seville; Andalusia, Spain
- Coordinates: 37°22′54″N 5°59′40″W
- Platforms: 1 island platform, 65 m long, with platform screen doors
- Tracks: 2

Construction
- Structure type: Underground
- Depth: 26.5 m (87 ft)
- Accessible: Yes

Other information
- Fare zone

History
- Opened: 16 September 2009; 16 years ago

Services
Preceding station	Seville Metro	Following station
Plaza de Cuba towards Ciudad Expo	Line 1	Prado de San Sebastián towards Olivar de Quintos
Preceding station	MetroCentro Seville	Following station
Archivo de Indias towards Plaza Nueva	MetroCentro	Prado de San Sebastián towards San Bernardo
Location

Puerta Jerez is a station on line of the Seville Metro. It is also, a tram stop of the T1 (Metrocentro) line. The metro station was inaugurated on September 16, 2009 and so far, it is the nearest at historic centre of the city.

== Location and structure ==
Puerta Jerez is an underground station, situated between Plaza de Cuba and Prado de San Sebastián stations on line 1. The station has only one access point and is located beneath the Puerta Jerez parking facility, at the intersection of Paseo de Cristina Av. and Almirante Lobo St., in the district of Casco Antiguo, and also provides convenient access to key areas such as the Guadalquivir River.

=== Platform and safety features ===
The station has an island platform with shared accesses and platform screen doors to prevent falls onto the tracks. It is also equipped with emergency evacuation systems to ensure passenger safety.

== Connections ==
Bus: 5, 30, 41, C3, C4, M-140, M-150, M-151, M-152, M-153
Tram: MetroCentro (T1)

== See also ==
- List of Seville metro stations
