= Guadaíra railway station =

Railway station in Seville, Spain

Guadaíra

General information
- Location: Carretera de Utrera, Cerro-Amate, Seville; Andalusia, Spain
- Coordinates: 37°21′30″N 5°56′50″W
- Platforms: Metro: Island platform, 65 m with platform screen doors Cercanías: 2 Side platforms, 120 m
- Tracks: 4

Construction
- Platform levels: 2
- Accessible: Yes

Other information
- Fare zone: 1
Location

Guadaíra is a railway interchange station between Seville Metro and commuter train services of Seville, Andalusia. It is located at the outskirts of the city, close to Utrera road. Guadaíra is an elevated station of line 1 of the metro and the C-4 circular line of the suburban trains (Spanish: Cercanías).

== See also ==
- List of Seville metro stations

Preceding station	Seville Metro	Following station
Cocheras towards Ciudad Expo	Line 1	Pablo de Olavide towards Olivar de Quintos
Renfe
Virgen del Rocío	C-4	Palacio de Congresos
