= Blas Infante (Seville Metro) =

Seville Metro station

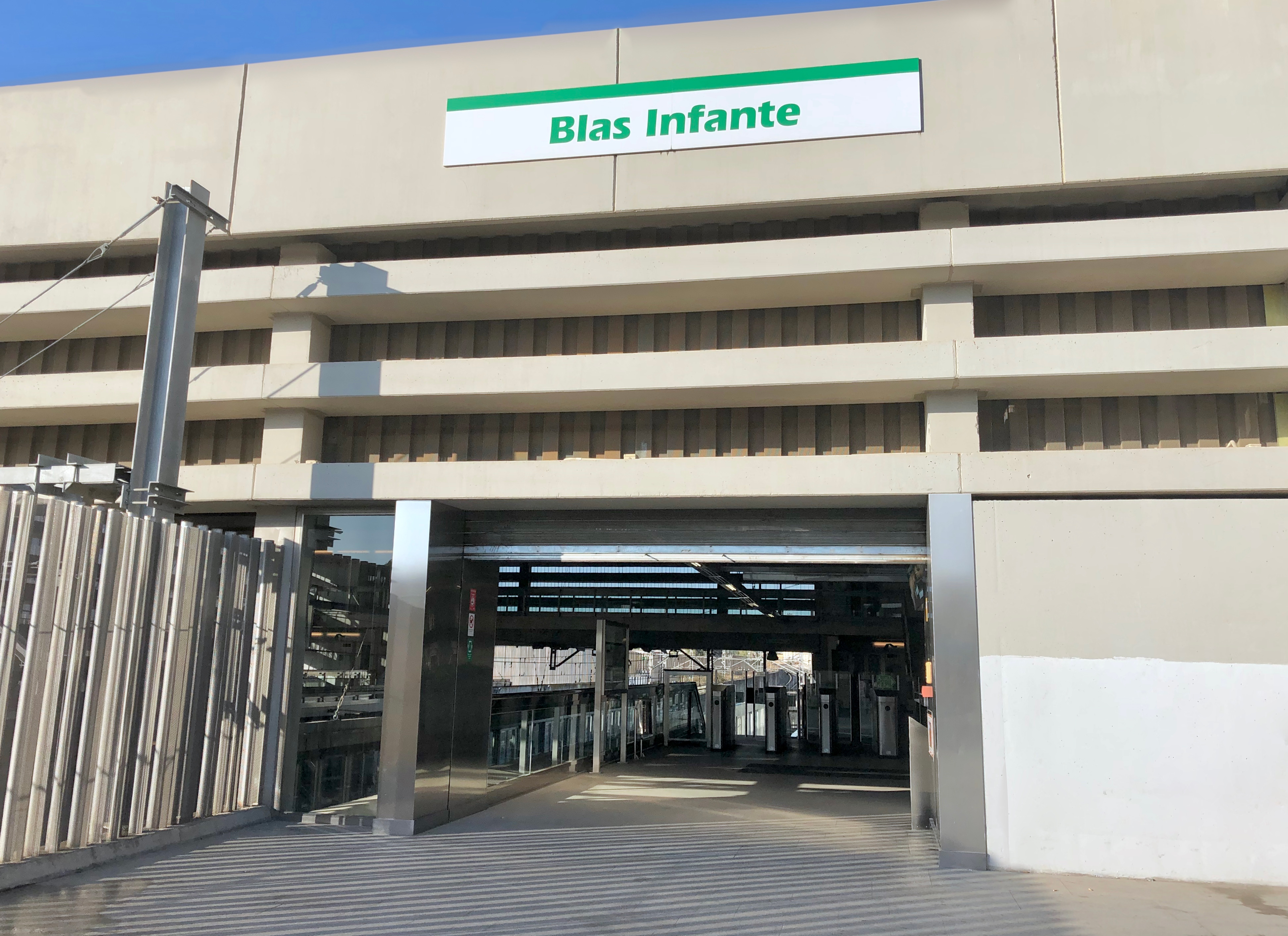

General information
- Location: Av. Blas Infante, Los Remedios, Seville; Andalusia, Spain
- Coordinates: 37°22′24″N 6°00′38″W
- Platforms: 1 Side platform, 65 m long, with platform screen doors
- Tracks: 2

Construction
- Accessible: Yes

Other information
- Fare zone

History
- Opened: 2 April 2009; 17 years ago

Services
Preceding station	Seville Metro	Following station
San Juan Bajo towards Ciudad Expo	Line 1	Parque de los Príncipes towards Olivar de Quintos
Location

Blas Infante is a station on line of the Seville Metro, located within the municipality of Seville, specifically in the Los Remedios district. It is the first (or last) station within this municipality. It was opened on April 2, 2009.

== Location and structure ==
Blas Infante is a trenched station, meaning it is built below street level but remains open to the surface. It is situated between San Juan Bajo and Parque de los Príncipes stations on line 1.

== Platform and safety features ==
The station has side platforms with separate accesses and platform screen doors to prevent falls onto the tracks. It is also equipped with emergency evacuation systems to ensure passenger safety.

== Similar stations ==
Blas Infante is the only trenched station on line 1 of the Seville Metro.

== Connections ==
Bus: 41, M-140, M-150, M-151, M-152, M-153, M-162, M-240

== See also ==
- List of Seville metro stations
