= Cocheras (Seville Metro) =

Seville Metro station

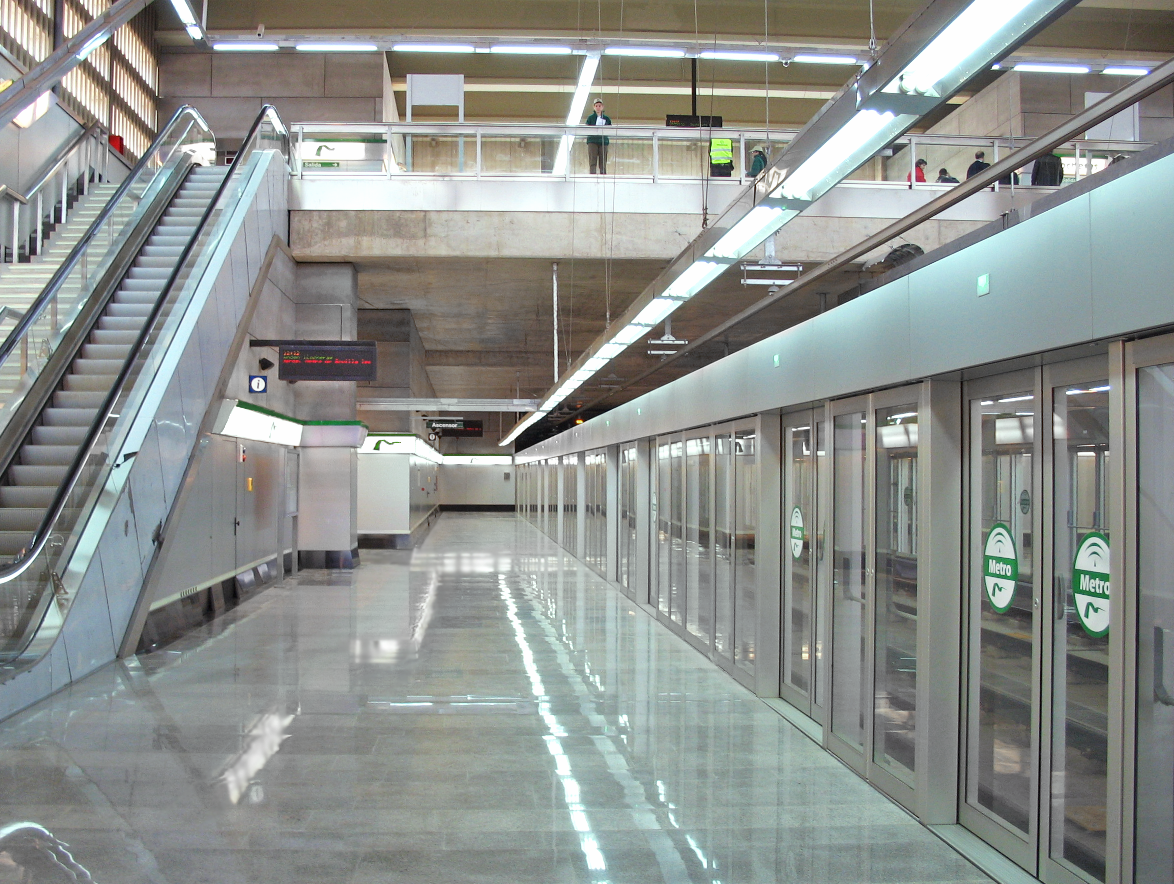

General information
- Location: Park of the Music, Cerro-Amate, Seville; Andalusia, Spain
- Coordinates: 37°22′04″N 5°57′01″W
- Operator: yes
- Platforms: 1 Side platform, 65 m long, with platform screen doors
- Tracks: 2
- Connections: Bus: 26

Construction
- Structure type: Underground
- Depth: 12 m (39 ft)
- Parking: yes
- Accessible: Yes

Other information
- Fare zone: 1

History
- Opened: 2 April 2009; 17 years ago

Services
Preceding station	Seville Metro	Following station
La Plata towards Ciudad Expo	Line 1	Guadaíra towards Olivar de Quintos
Location

Cocheras (English: Garages) is a station on line 1 of the metro. It is located at the intersection of Águila Marina and Águila de Oro streets, in the neighborhood of Cerro del Águila. Cocheras is an underground station, situated between La Plata and Guadaíra on the same line. It was opened on 2 April 2009.

== See also ==
- List of Seville metro stations
