= Condequinto (Seville Metro) =

Seville Metro station

General information
- Location: Montequinto Av., Dos Hermanas, Andalusia; Spain
- Coordinates: 37°20′43″N 5°56′04″W
- Platforms: 1 Island platform, 65 m long, with platform screen doors
- Tracks: 2
- Connections: Bus: M-123, M-130

Construction
- Structure type: Ground
- Accessible: Yes

Other information
- Fare zone: 2

History
- Opened: 2 April 2009; 17 years ago

Services
Preceding station	Seville Metro	Following station
Pablo de Olavide towards Ciudad Expo	Line 1	Montequinto towards Olivar de Quintos
Location

Condequinto is a station of the Seville Metro on line 1 named after the neighborhood of Condequinto, Dos Hermanas. It is located close to Utrera road and Montequinto Av. Condequinto is a ground type building with elevated hall. The station is situated between Pablo de Olavide and Montequinto on the same line. It was opened on 2 April 2009.

== See also ==
- List of Seville metro stations
