= Gran Plaza (Seville Metro) =

Seville Metro station

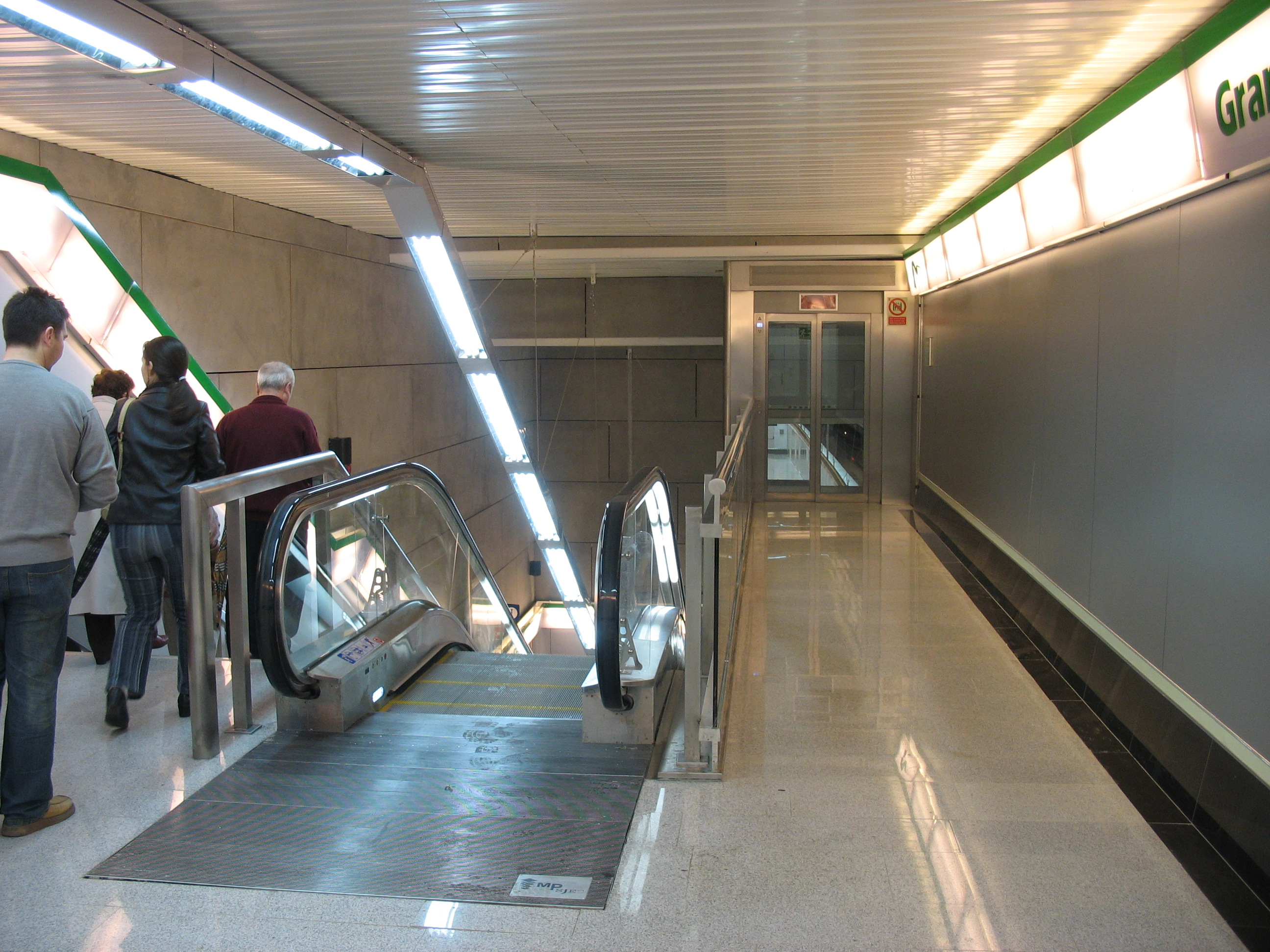

General information
- Location: Av. Eduardo Dato, Nervión, Seville; Andalusia, Spain
- Coordinates: 37°22′54″N 5°58′00″W
- Platforms: 1 Side platform, 65 m long, with platform screen doors
- Tracks: 2
- Connections: Bus: 5, 22, 29, 32, 52, B3, B4, M-121, M-122, M-221

Construction
- Structure type: Underground
- Depth: 14 m (46 ft)
- Accessible: Yes

Other information
- Fare zone: 1

History
- Opened: 2 April 2009; 17 years ago

Services
Preceding station	Seville Metro	Following station
Nervión towards Ciudad Expo	Line 1	1º de Mayo towards Olivar de Quintos
Location

Gran Plaza (English: Great Square) is an underground station of the Seville Metro on the line 1. It is located at the intersection of Eduardo Dato and Cruzcampo avenues, in the neighborhood of Nervión. Gran Plaza station is located by the Gran Plaza square, between the stations Nervión and 1º de Mayo on the same line. It was opened on 2 April 2009.

== See also ==
- List of Seville metro stations
