= Prado de San Sebastián (Seville Metro) =

Seville Metro station

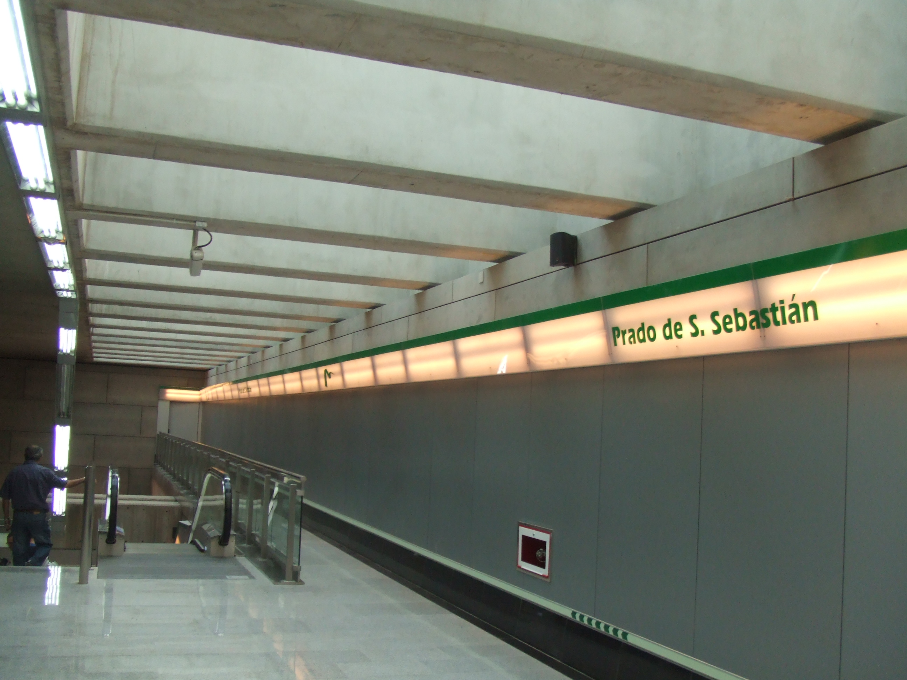

General information
- Location: Av. Carlos V, Casco Antiguo, Seville; Andalusia, Spain
- Coordinates: 37°22′50″N 5°59′13″W
- Platforms: 1 Island platform, 65 m long, with platform screen doors
- Tracks: 2

Construction
- Structure type: Underground
- Depth: 20 m (66 ft)
- Accessible: Yes

Other information
- Fare zone

History
- Opened: 2 April 2009; 17 years ago

Services
Preceding station	Seville Metro	Following station
Puerta Jerez towards Ciudad Expo	Line 1	San Bernardo towards Olivar de Quintos
Preceding station	MetroCentro Seville	Following station
Puerta Jerez towards Plaza Nueva	MetroCentro	San Bernardo Terminus
Location

Prado de San Sebastián is a station on line of the Seville Metro. It also serves as an interurban bus station and a tram stop. The station is located at the intersection of Carlos V Avenue, Portugal Avenue, Menéndez y Pelayo Avenue, and San Fernando Street, in the Casco Antiguo district.

== Location and structure ==
Prado de San Sebastián is an underground station, situated between Puerta Jerez and San Bernardo stations on line 1' It provides connections to intercity bus services and the T1 (Metrocentro) tram line, making it a key transportation hub in Seville.

=== Platform and safety features ===
The station has an island platform with shared accesses and platform screen doors to prevent falls onto the tracks. It is also equipped with emergency evacuation systems to ensure passenger safety.

== Connections ==
- Bus: 1, 5, 21, 22, 25, 26, 28, 29, 30, 31, 34, 37, 41, C1, C2, C3, C4, EA
- Intercity Bus: M-121, M-122, M-123, M-131, M-132, M-13B, M-133, M-124, M-220, M-221
- Tram: MetroCentro (T1)

== Future expansion ==
Metro line is scheduled to connect to Prado de San Sebastián in 2030. The project has been under construction since 2023.

== See also ==
- List of Seville metro stations
