= Europa (Seville Metro) =

Seville Metro station

General information
- Location: Montequinto Av. Dos Hermanas, Andalusia; Spain
- Coordinates: 37°20′13″N 5°56′07″W
- Platforms: 1 Island platform, 65 m long, with platform screen doors
- Tracks: 2
- Connections: Bus: M-123, M-130

Construction
- Structure type: Underground
- Depth: 6 m (20 ft)
- Accessible: Yes

Other information
- Fare zone: 2

History
- Opened: 23 November 2009; 16 years ago

Services
Preceding station	Seville Metro	Following station
Montequinto towards Ciudad Expo	Line 1	Olivar de Quintos Terminus
Location

Europa (English: Europe) is a station of the Seville Metro on line 1 in the municipality of Dos Hermanas, Province of Seville. It is located in the intersection of Montequinto and Europa avenues, in the neighborhood of Montequinto. Europa is an underground type station situated between Montequinto and Olivar de Quintos on the same line. It was opened on 23 November 2009.

== See also ==
- List of Seville metro stations
