= Plaza de Cuba (Seville Metro) =

Seville Metro station

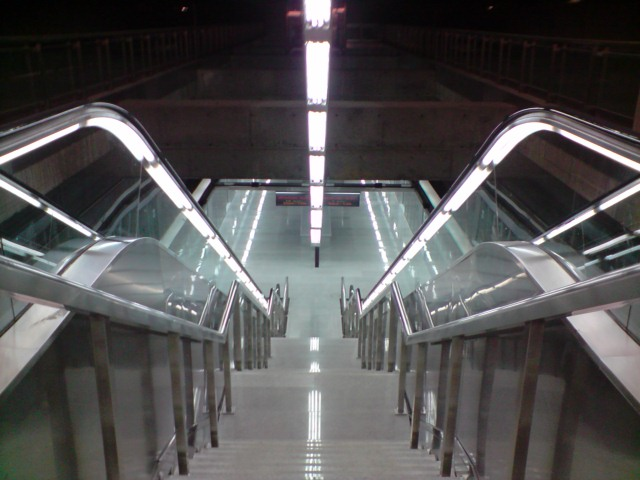

General information
- Location: Av. República Argentina, Los Remedios, Seville, Andalusia; Spain
- Coordinates: 37°22′49″N 5°59′51″W
- Platforms: 1 Island platform, 65 m long, with platform screen doors
- Tracks: 2

Construction
- Structure type: Underground
- Depth: 24 m (79 ft)
- Accessible: Yes

Other information
- Fare zone

History
- Opened: 2 April 2009; 17 years ago

Services
Preceding station	Seville Metro	Following station
Parque de los Príncipes towards Ciudad Expo	Line 1	Puerta Jerez towards Olivar de Quintos
Location

Plaza de Cuba is a station on line of the Seville Metro. It is located at the intersection of República Argentina Avenue and Asunción Street, in the Los Remedios district. The station was inaugurated on April 2, 2009, as part of the initial launch of the Seville Metro system.

== Location and structure ==
Plaza de Cuba is an underground station, situated between Parque de los Príncipes and Puerta Jerez stations on line 1. The station has only one access point and is located beneath the Plaza de Cuba parking facility, optimizing space usage in the area. Plaza de Cuba station also provides convenient access to key areas such as the Guadalquivir River, the historic district of Triana, and the Seville Fair (Real de la Feria).

=== Platform and safety features ===
The station has an island platform with shared accesses and platform screen doors to prevent falls onto the tracks. It is also equipped with emergency evacuation systems to ensure passenger safety.

== Connections ==
Bus: 5, 40, 41, C3, M-140, M-150, M-151, M-152, M-153, M-240

== See also ==
- List of Seville metro stations
