= San Bernardo railway station =

Railway station in Seville, Spain

San Bernardo
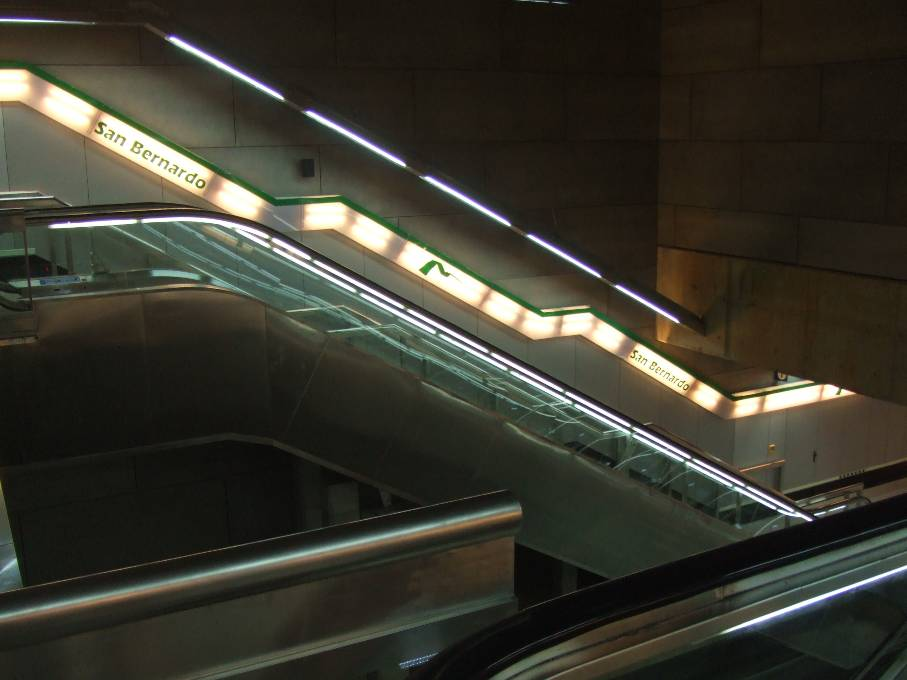

General information
- Location: Av. Eduardo Dato, Nervión, Seville; Andalusia, Spain
- Coordinates: 37°22′43″N 5°58′46″W
- Platforms: 2 Metro: Island platform Cercanías: Side platform, Metro: 65 m Cercanías: 120 m long, with platform screen doors
- Tracks: 2
- Connections: Bus: 5, 22, 25, 26, 28, 29, C1, C2, EA, M-121, M-122, M-123, M-130, M-220

Construction
- Structure type: Underground
- Depth: 24 m (79 ft)
- Accessible: Yes

Other information
- Fare zone

History
- Opened: 2 April 2009; 17 years ago
Location

San Bernardo is a railway interchange station of metro and suburban trains services of Seville, Andalusia. It is located at the intersection of the avenues of La Enramadilla and La Buhaira in the neighborhood of San Bernardo. San Bernardo is a station on line of the Seville Metro and the lines C-1 and C-4 of the suburban trains (Spanish: Cercanías). The suburban station was opened to the public in 1992 while the metro station was inaugurated on 2 April 2009, and opened on 15 April 2011. It is also a terminus for the Metrocentro tram line.

== Connections ==
Preceding station	Renfe Operadora	Following station
Seville-Santa Justa Terminus	Media Distancia 65	Virgen del Rocío towards Cádiz
Seville-Santa Justa Terminus	Media Distancia 67	Dos Hermanas towards Málaga María Zambrano
Seville-Santa Justa Terminus	Media Distancia 68	Dos Hermanas towards Almería
Preceding station	Cercanías Sevilla	Following station
Seville-Santa Justa towards Lora del Río	C-1	Virgen del Rocío towards Lebrija
Seville-Santa Justa clockwise loop	C-4	Virgen del Rocío counter-clockwise loop
Seville-Santa Justa towards Benacazón	C-5	Virgen del Rocío towards Jardines de Hércules
Preceding station	Seville Metro	Following station
Prado de San Sebastián towards Ciudad Expo	Line 1	Nervión towards Olivar de Quintos
Preceding station	MetroCentro Seville	Following station
Prado de San Sebastián towards Plaza Nueva	MetroCentro	Terminus

== See also ==
- List of Seville metro stations
