= La Plata (Seville Metro) =

Seville Metro station

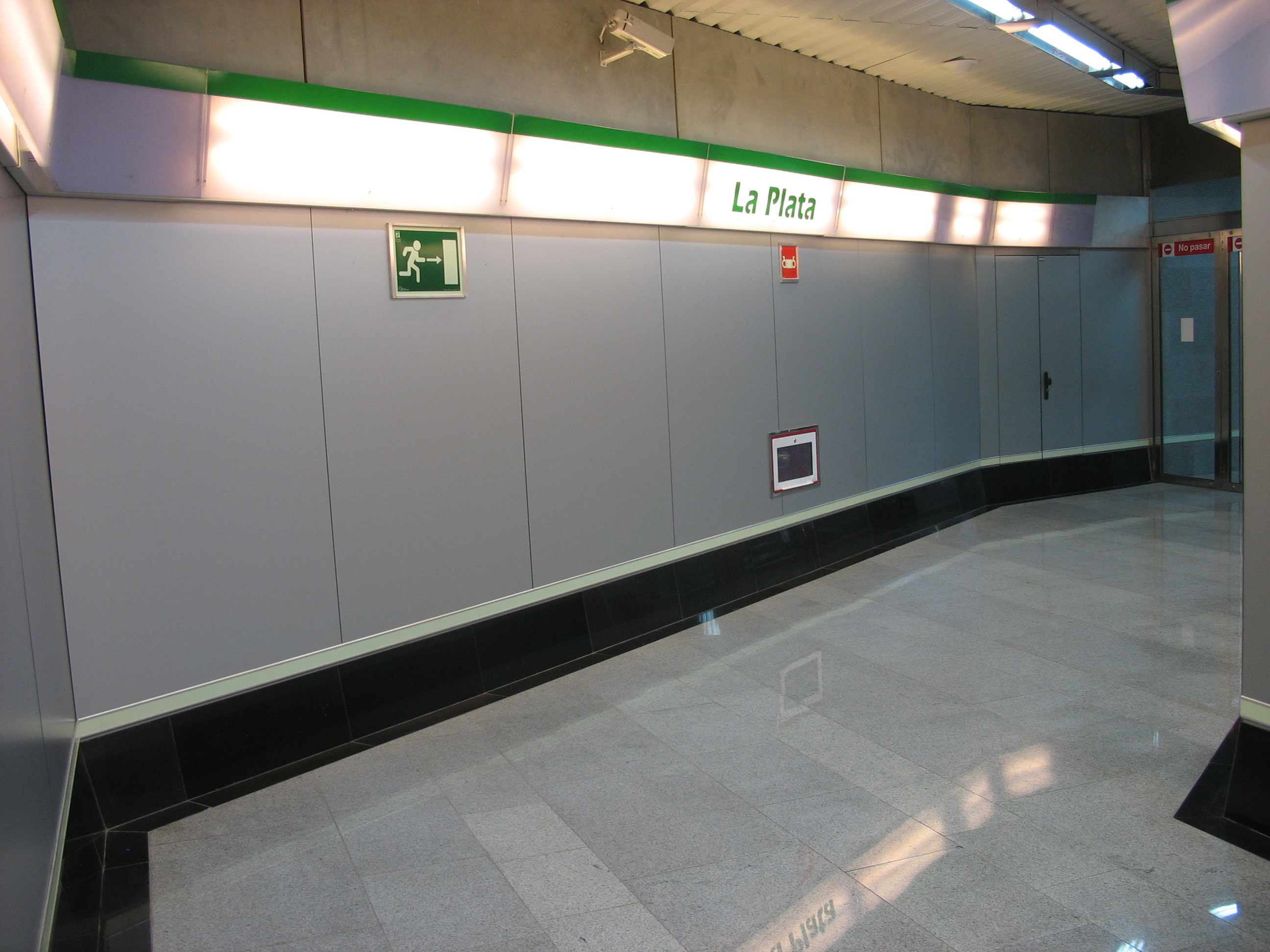

General information
- Location: Av. Los Gavilanes, Cerro-Amate, Seville; Andalusia, Spain
- Coordinates: 37°22′23″N 5°57′10″W
- Platforms: 1 Side platform, 65 m long, with platform screen doors
- Tracks: 2
- Connections: Bus: 25, 26, 52

Construction
- Structure type: Underground
- Depth: 12 m (39 ft)
- Accessible: Yes

Other information
- Fare zone: 1

History
- Opened: 2 April 2009; 17 years ago

Services
Preceding station	Seville Metro	Following station
Amate towards Ciudad Expo	Line 1	Cocheras towards Olivar de Quintos
Location

La Plata (English: The Silver) is a station of the Seville Metro on the line 1. It is located at the intersection of Los Gavilanes Av. and Virgen de la Saleta St., in the neighborhood of Parque Amate. La Plata is an underground station, located between Amate and Cocheras on the same line. It was opened on 2 April 2009.

== See also ==
- List of Seville metro stations
