= Amate (Seville Metro) =

Seville Metro station

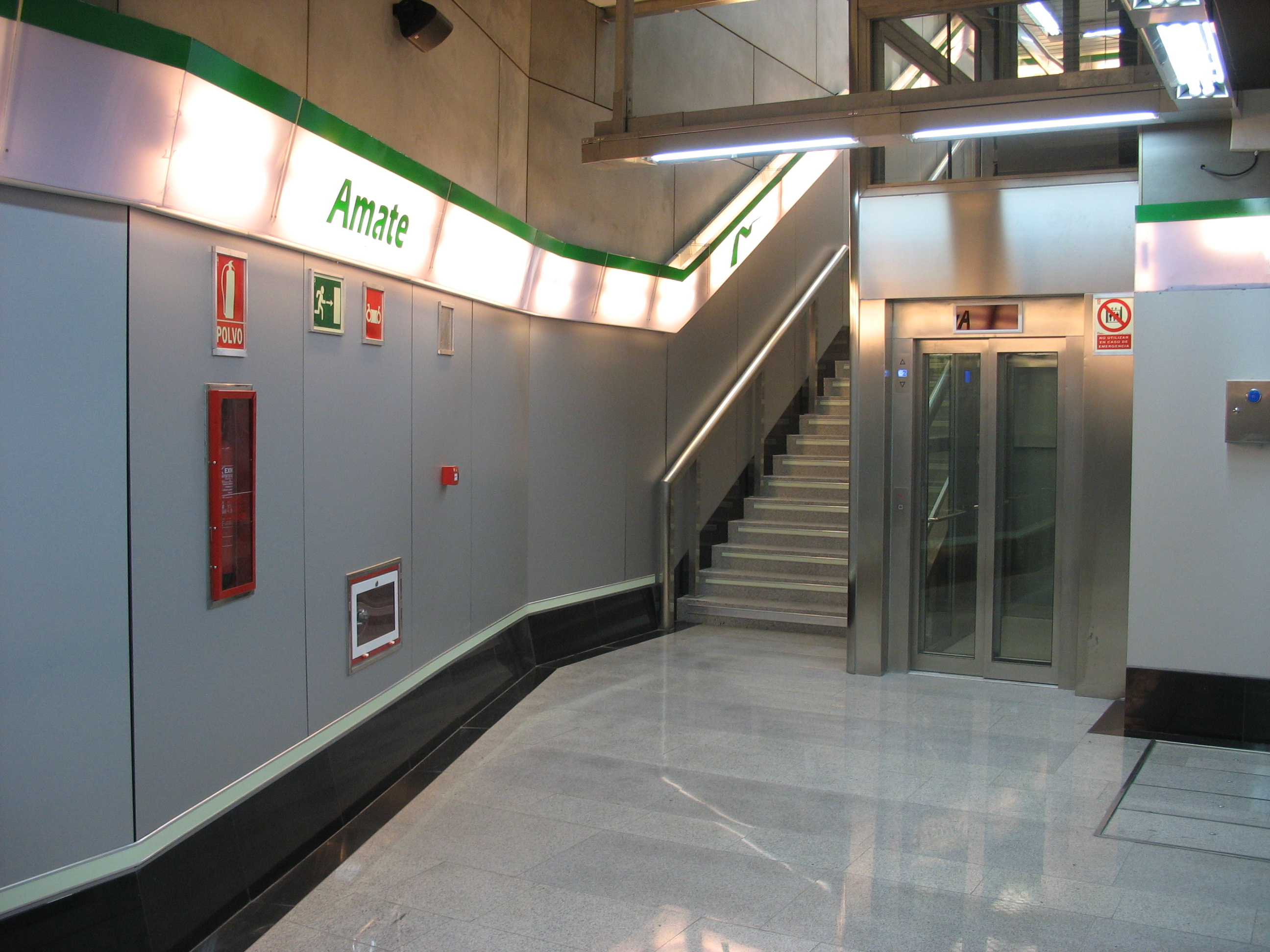

General information
- Location: Av. Los Gavilanes, Cerro-Amate, Seville; Andalusia, Spain
- Coordinates: 37°22′39″N 5°57′08″W
- Platforms: 1 Side platform, 65 m long, with platform screen doors
- Tracks: 2
- Connections: Bus: 5, 24, 52

Construction
- Structure type: Underground
- Depth: 12 m (39 ft)
- Accessible: Yes

Other information
- Fare zone: 1

History
- Opened: 2 April 2009; 17 years ago

Services
Preceding station	Seville Metro	Following station
1º de Mayo towards Ciudad Expo	Line 1	La Plata towards Olivar de Quintos
Location

Amate is a station of the Seville Metro on the line 1. It is located at the intersection of Los Gavilanes Av. and Puerto del Escudo St., in the neighborhood of Parque Amate. Amate is an underground station, located between 1º de Mayo and La Plata stations on the same line. It was opened on 2 April 2009.

== See also ==
- List of Seville metro stations
