= Cavaleri (Seville Metro) =

Seville Metro station

General information
- Location: Jagüey Grande Sq., Mairena del Aljarafe; Andalusia, Spain
- Coordinates: 37°21′10″N 6°02′48″W
- Platforms: 1 Side platform, 65 m long, with platform screen doors
- Tracks: 2

Construction
- Structure type: Underground
- Depth: 6 m (20 ft)
- Accessible: Yes

Other information
- Fare zone: 0

History
- Opened: 2 April 2009; 17 years ago

Services
| Preceding station | Seville Metro | Following station |
|---|---|---|
| Ciudad Expo Terminus | Line 1 | San Juan Alto towards Olivar de Quintos |
Location

Cavaleri is a station of line 1 of the Seville metro. It is located in the Jagüey Grande Square, in the municipality of Mairena del Aljarafe, Seville. Cavaleri is an underground type station, situated between Ciudad Expo and San Juan Alto on the same line. It was opened on April 2, 2009.

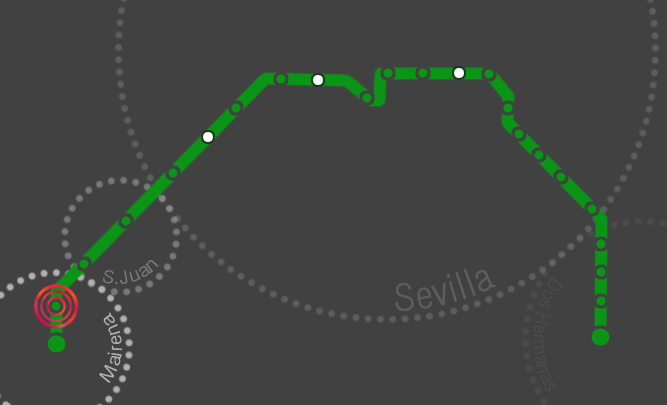
Location

== Connections ==
Metropolitan bus services
| Line | Destination | Zone |
|---|---|---|
| M-150 | Mairena del Aljarafe | B |
| M-151 | Urb. Pluebla del Marqués, Mairena del Aljarafe | B |
| M-152 | Palomares del Río | B |
| M-153 | Almensilla | B |
| M-155 | Almensilla | B |

== See also ==
- List of Seville metro stations
