= Pablo de Olavide (Seville Metro) =

Seville Metro station

General information
- Location: Carretera de Utrera, Cerro-Amate, Seville; Andalusia, Spain
- Coordinates: 37°21′14″N 5°56′36″W
- Platforms: 1 Metro: Island platform, 65 m long, with platform screen doors
- Tracks: 2
- Connections: Tram: Tranvía Metropolitano de Alcalá de Guadaíra

Construction
- Structure type: Elevated
- Accessible: Yes

Other information
- Fare zone: 1 and 2

History
- Opened: 2 April 2009; 17 years ago

Services
| Preceding station | Seville Metro | Following station |
|---|---|---|
| Guadaíra towards Ciudad Expo | Line 1 | Condequinto towards Olivar de Quintos |
Location

Pablo de Olavide is a station of the Seville Metro on line 1 named after the nearby Universidad Pablo de Olavide. This station will also be a tram stop for the Alcalá de Guadaíra tram line that is under construction and projected to be completed in 2019. It is located at the outskirts of the city within the University Campus, close to Utrera road. Pablo de Olavide is an elevated building, situated between Guadaíra and Condequinto stations on the same line. It was opened on 2 April 2009.

== See also ==
- List of Seville metro stations
