= 1º de Mayo (Seville Metro) =

Seville Metro station

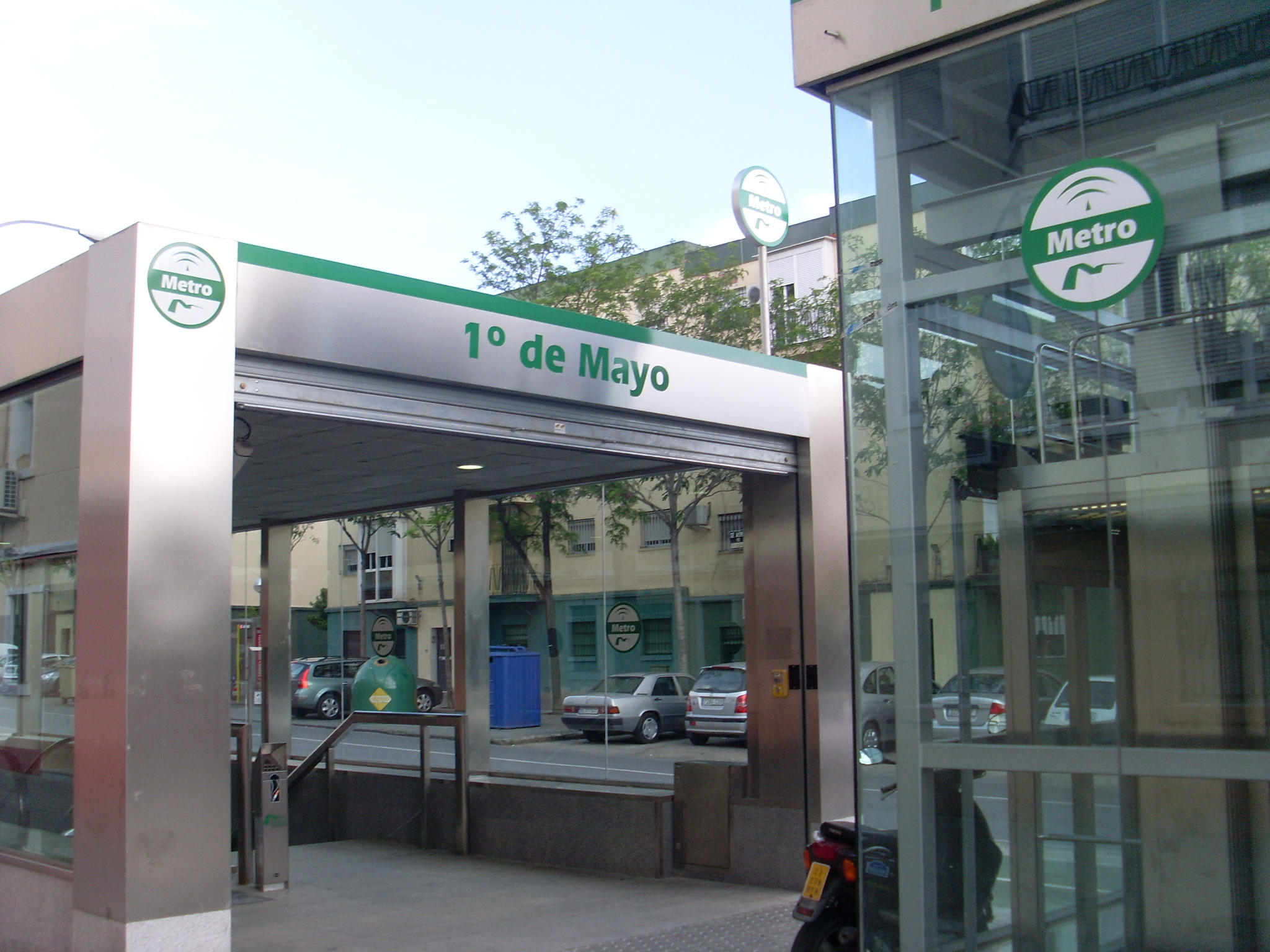

General information
- Location: Av. Federico Mayo Gayarre, Cerro-Amate, Seville; Andalusia, Spain
- Coordinates: 37°22′51″N 5°57′20″W
- Platforms: 1 Side platform, 65 m long, with platform screen doors
- Tracks: 2
- Connections: Bus: 5, 24, 52

Construction
- Structure type: Underground
- Depth: 12 m (39 ft)
- Accessible: Yes

Other information
- Fare zone: 1

History
- Opened: 2 April 2009; 17 years ago

Services
Preceding station	Seville Metro	Following station
Gran Plaza towards Ciudad Expo	Line 1	Amate towards Olivar de Quintos
Location

1º de Mayo (English: 1 May) is a station of the Seville Metro on line 1. It is located at the intersection of Federico Mayo Gayarre and Ronda del Tamarguillo avenues in the district of Cerro-Amate. 1º de Mayo is an underground station situated between Gran Plaza and Amate on the same line. It was opened on 2 April 2009. It was opened on 2 April 2009. By 2017, a connection with line 4 of the subway was planned, but the line has not yet been built.

According to ridership trends for the Seville Metro system, the station and others in similar urban districts have shown notable increases in passenger numbers in recent years, particularly during peak cultural events such as the Feria de Abril, when the entire network operates with extended hours and higher capacity to accommodate demand.

== See also ==
- List of Seville metro stations
