= Carretera Amarilla / Tesalónica (Seville Metro) =

Planned interchange station in Seville, Andalusia, Spain

C. Amarilla / Tesalónica

General information
- Location: Carretera Amarilla, East, Seville, Andalusia; Spain
- Coordinates: 37.232729°N 5.572954°W
- Platforms: 2 Side platform, 65 m long, with platform screen doors
- Tracks: 2
- Connections: Bus: 2, 27, B4

Construction
- Structure type: Underground
- Depth: 16.5 m (54 ft)
- Accessible: Yes

Other information
- Fare zone: 1

History
- Opened: By 2017
Location

Carretera Amarilla / Tesalónica (English: Yellow Road / Thessaloniki) will be an interchange station between metro services of Seville subway system, Andalusia. The station will be located in the intersection of Montesierra Av. and Tesalónica St. close to Industrial park known as Polígono Industrial Carretera Amarilla. It will be an underground interchange station between the lines 2 (named Tesalónica) and 4 (named Carretera Amarilla) of the Seville Metro. Construction work will begin in late 2011, and the station is expected to be operational during 2017.

== Future services ==
Metro service at this station
<< Toward	< Preceding	Line	Following >	Toward >>
Torre Triana	San Pablo		Montesierra	Parque Tecnológico
Circle line	Clemente Hidalgo		Pedro Romero	Circle line

== See also ==
- List of Seville metro stations
