= Nervión (Seville Metro) =

Seville Metro station

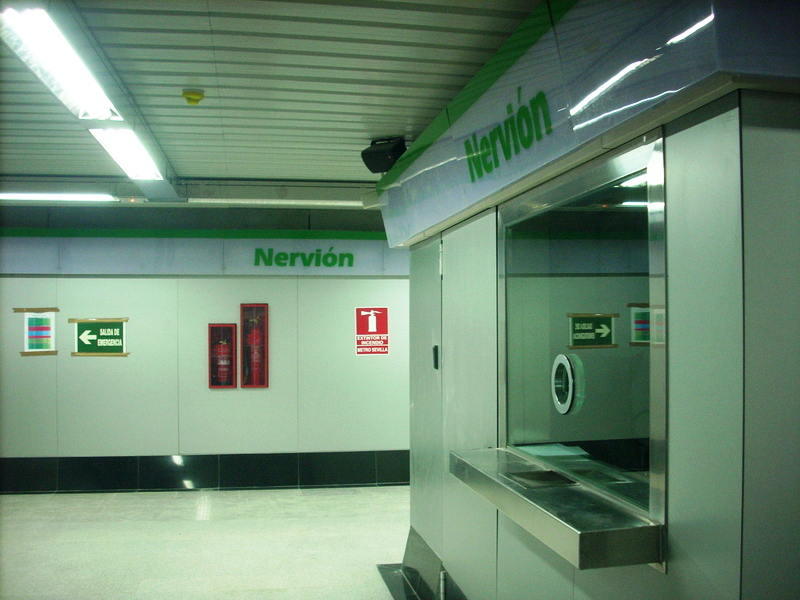

General information
- Location: Av. Eduardo Dato, Nervión, Seville; Andalusia, Spain
- Coordinates: 37°22′59″N 5°58′27″W
- Platforms: 1 Side platform, 65 m long, with platform screen doors
- Tracks: 2
- Connections: Bus: 5, 22, 28, 29, 32, B3, B4, C1, C2, EA, M-220

Construction
- Structure type: Underground
- Depth: 15 m (49 ft)
- Accessible: Yes

Other information
- Fare zone: 1

History
- Opened: 2 April 2009; 17 years ago

Services
Preceding station	Seville Metro	Following station
San Bernardo towards Ciudad Expo	Line 1	Gran Plaza towards Olivar de Quintos
Location

Nervión (English: Nervion) is an underground station of the Seville Metro on the line 1. The station is located at the intersection of the avenues of Eduardo Dato and San Fco. Javier, in the neighborhood of Nervión. Nervión station is located between San Bernardo and Gran Plaza stations on the same line. The station was opened on 2 April 2009.

== See also ==
- List of Seville metro stations
