= Nervión (disambiguation) =

Nervion is a river in the Basque Country.

Nervión may also refer to:

- Nervión, Seville, a district of Seville, Spain
  - Nervión (Seville Metro) station
