= Tranvía Metropolitano de Alcalá de Guadaíra =

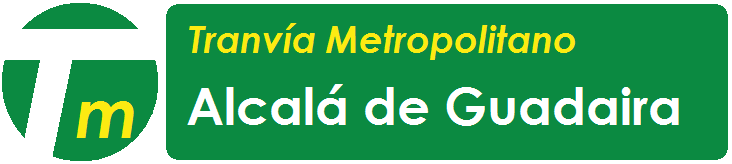

Overview
- Locale: Alcalá de Guadaíra, Andalusia, Spain
- Transit type: Light rail
- Number of lines: 1
- Number of stations: 11

Operation
- Operation will start: 2025
- Number of vehicles: 5

Technical
- System length: 12.5 km (7.8 mi)
- Track gauge: 1,435 mm (4 ft 8 1/2 in) standard gauge
- Top speed: 70 km/h (43 mph)

The Tranvía Metropolitano de Alcalá de Guadaíra (English: Metropolitan Tram of Alcalá de Guadaíra) is a light rail line currently under construction in the Spanish town of Alcalá de Guadaíra.

== Background ==
Construction on the line began in 2007, but was suspended in 2012 due to the 2008–2014 Spanish financial crisis. Works resumed in 2015, with the line originally expected to open in 2023, but was pushed back to 2025 at the earliest.

== Route ==
The line's western terminus is at the existing Pablo de Olavide station of the Seville Metro, using part of a former railway alignment eastward to serve the town centre of Alcalá de Guadaíra with a total of twelve stops. Five million passengers a year are expected to use the tram once completed. Originally due to serve as a stand-alone tram line, plans were changed to allow through-running from Pablo de Olavide to Seville city centre using Seville Metro line 1's infrastructure.
