= List of Seville metro stations =

This is a list of stations of the Seville Metro system.

The line is administered by Seville Metro.

Name	Opened	Municipality	District	Lines	Fare Zone	Connections
Ciudad Expo	April 2, 2009	Mairena del Aljarafe		Seville Metro line 1		
Cavaleri	April 2, 2009	Mairena del Aljarafe		Seville Metro line 1		
San Juan Alto	April 2, 2009	Mairena del Aljarafe		Seville Metro line 1		
San Juan Bajo	April 2, 2009	Mairena del Aljarafe		Seville Metro line 1		
Blas Infante	April 2, 2009	Seville	Los Remedios	Seville Metro line 1		
Parque de los Príncipes	April 2, 2009	Seville	Los Remedios	Seville Metro line 1		
Plaza de Cuba	April 2, 2009	Seville	Los Remedios	Seville Metro line 1		
Puerta Jerez	September 16, 2009	Seville	Casco Antiguo	Seville Metro line 1		
Prado de San Sebastián	April 2, 2009	Seville	Sur / Casco Antiguo	Seville Metro line 1		
San Bernardo	April 2, 2009	Seville	Sur / Nervión	Seville Metro line 1		Renfe
Nervión	April 2, 2009	Seville	Nervión	Seville Metro line 1		
Gran Plaza	April 2, 2009	Seville	Nervión	Seville Metro line 1		
1º de Mayo	April 2, 2009	Seville	Cerro-Amate	Seville Metro line 1		
Amate	April 2, 2009	Seville	Cerro-Amate	Seville Metro line 1		
La Plata	April 2, 2009	Seville	Cerro-Amate	Seville Metro line 1		
Cocheras	April 2, 2009	Seville	Cerro-Amate	Seville Metro line 1		
Pablo de Olavide	April 2, 2009	Seville	Sur	Seville Metro line 1		
Condequinto	April 2, 2009	Dos Hermanas	Montequinto	Seville Metro line 1		
Montequinto	November 23, 2009	Dos Hermanas	Montequinto	Seville Metro line 1		
Europa	November 23, 2009	Dos Hermanas	Montequinto	Seville Metro line 1		
Olivar de Quintos	November 23, 2009	Dos Hermanas	Montequinto	Seville Metro line 1		
