= San Juan de Aznalfarache =

San Juan de Aznalfarache, Spain
- City
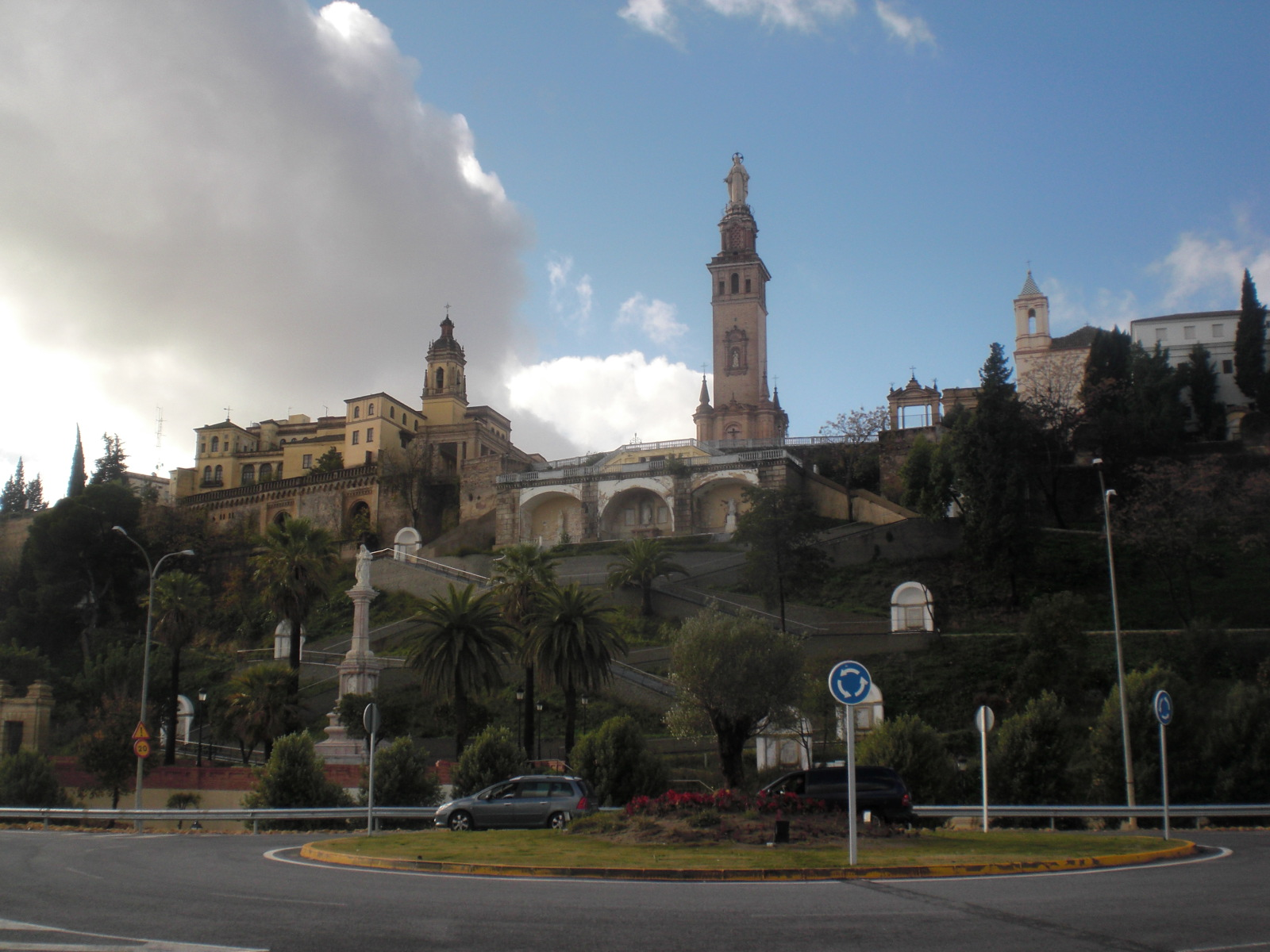
- Convent and Church of the Sacred Heart of Jesus, San Juan.

- Flag Coat of arms
- Interactive map of San Juan de Aznalfarache, Spain
- Coordinates: 37°22′N 6°01′W
- Country: Spain
- Region: Andalusia
- Province: Seville

Area
  - Total: 4 km^{2} (1.5 sq mi)
- Elevation: 49 m (161 ft)

Population (2025-01-01)
  - Total: 23,408
  - Density: 5,900/km^{2} (15,000/sq mi)
- Time zone: UTC+1 (CET)
  - Summer (DST): UTC+2 (CEST)

San Juan de Aznalfarache is a city located in the province of Seville, Spain. According to the 2006 census (INE), the city has a population of 20,121 inhabitants.

Despite being a separate municipality, San Juan is in the metropolitan area of Seville, to which it lies on an opposite bank of the Guadalquivir river. The city is linked by two road bridges and a pedestrian one to the Sevillian district of Triana on the Isla de La Cartuja.

San Juan lies to the north of Gelves, northeast of Mairena del Aljarafe and south of Tomares, which all also make up Seville's metropolitan area.

The city's name refers to the Fortress of Alfaraj (ar: حَصْن الڢَرَٰج, with its implied spelling as "[h]áçn al-faráŷ" in the Andalusī dialect), a known site for Muslim historians, which was likely built under the Umayyads but better known by the palace built by Al-Mu'tamid ibn Abbad in the 11th century.

== Notable people ==
- El Sevilla (born 1970), actor and singer

== See also ==
- List of municipalities in Seville
