= MetroCentro (Seville) =

Tram system in Seville, Spain

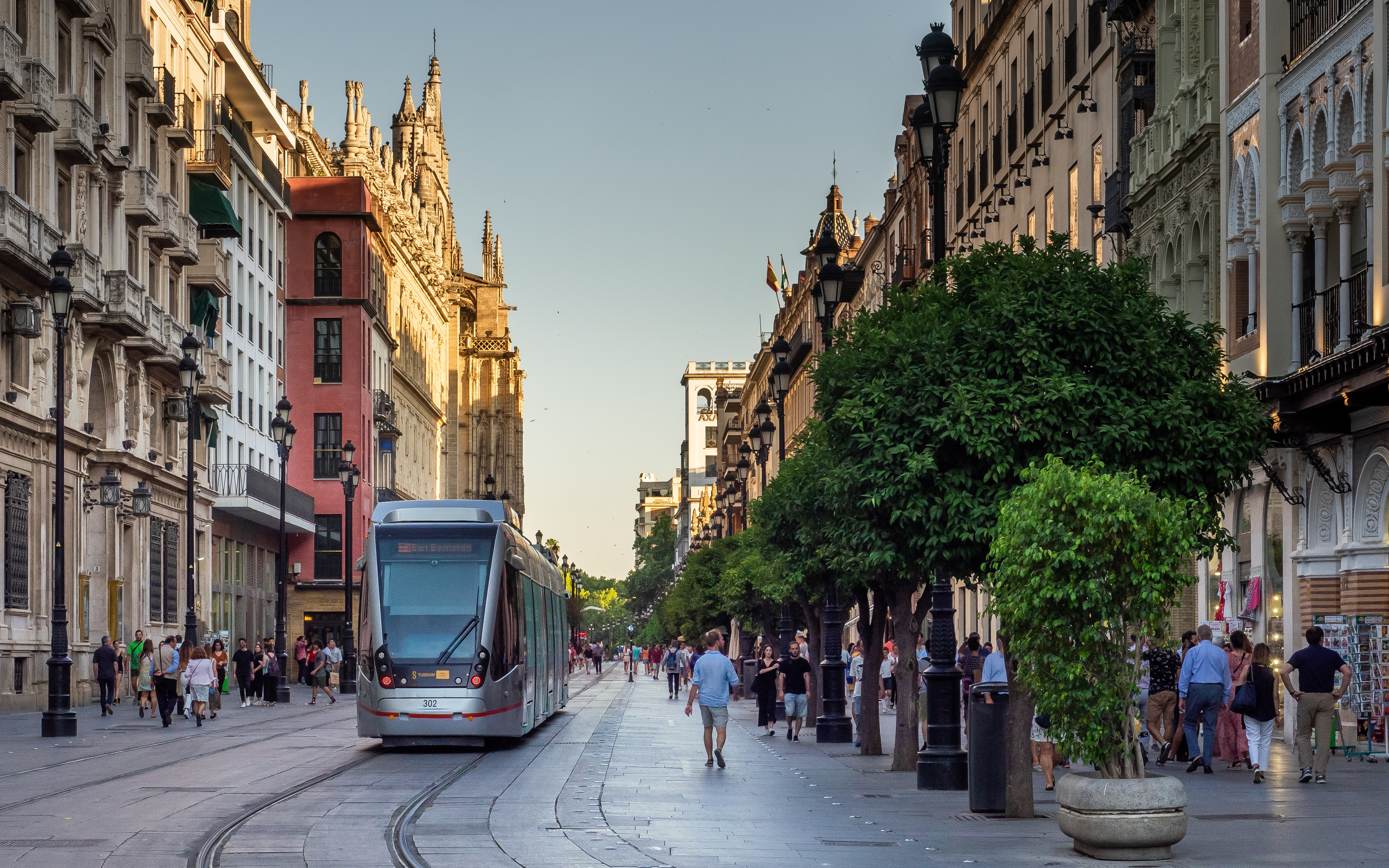
- The tram passing down Avenida de la Constitución

Overview
- Locale: Seville, Spain
- Transit type: Tram
- Number of lines: 1
- Number of stations: 8 (2 more planned)
- Annual ridership: 2.91 million (2023)
- Website: www.tussam.es

Operation
- Began operation: 28 October 2007
- Operator: TUSSAM
- Character: At grade, street running
- Number of vehicles: 6 CAF Urbos 3 trams

Technical
- System length: 3.5 km (2.2 mi)
- Track gauge: 1,435 mm (4 ft 8 1/2 in) standard gauge
- Average speed: 10 km/h (6.2 mph)
System map

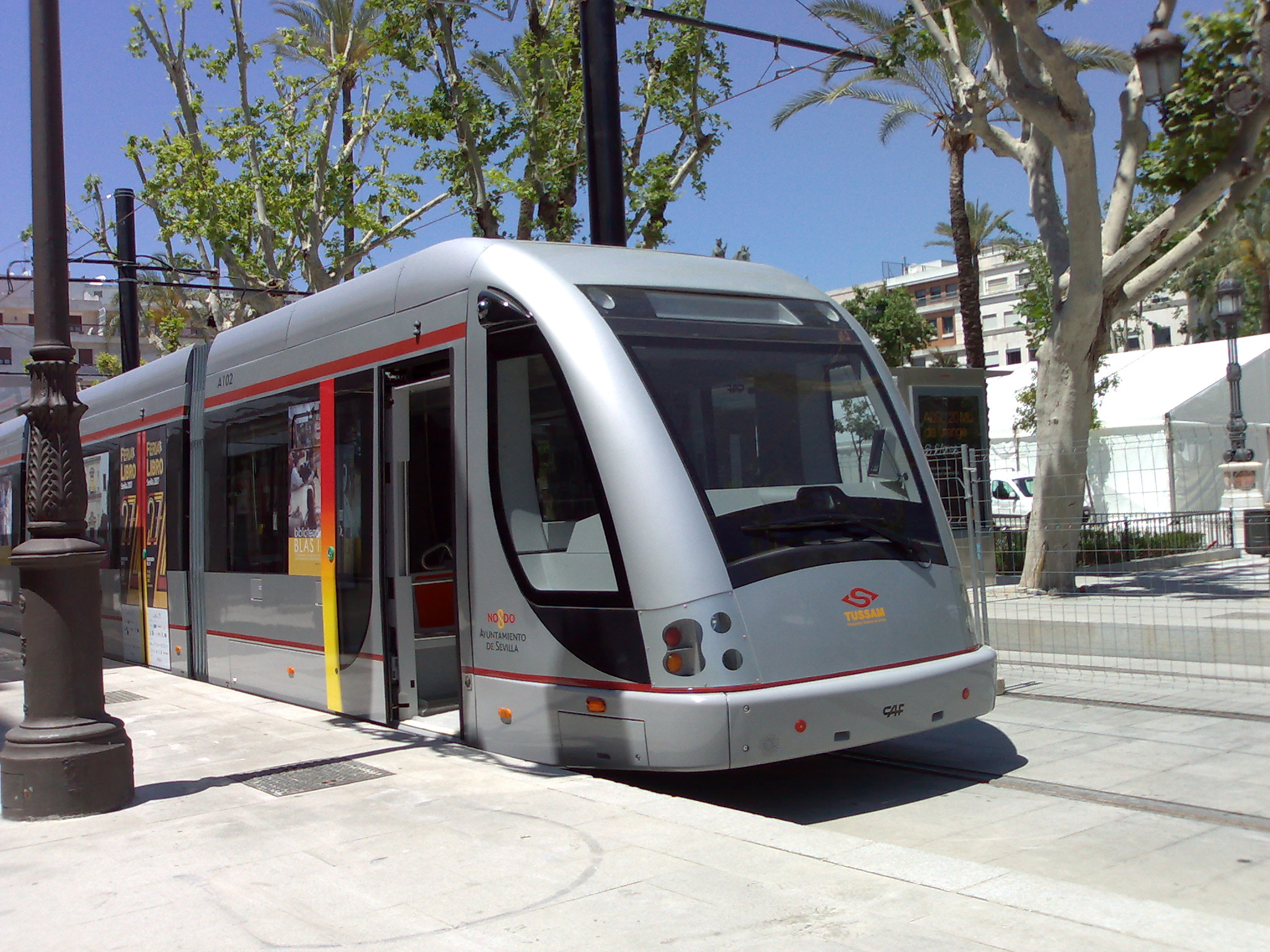
MetroCentro tram in Plaza Nueva

Metrocentro, popularly known as Tranvía de Sevilla (Spanish for Seville Tram), is a tram system serving the centre of the city of Seville, in Andalusia, Spain. It began operating in October 2007. The tram system only has one line, the T1. It is operated by TUSSAM.

The tram has connections with the Seville Metro and Cercanías Sevilla.

== Overview ==
As of 2024, the service consists of eight stops: Plaza Nueva, Archivo de Indias, Puerta de Jerez, Prado de San Sebastián, San Bernardo, San Francisco Javier, Eduardo Dato and Luis de Morales. The service is expected to be extended to Santa Justa AVE station, including two new stops: Kansas City and Santa Justa.

The project works began in mid-2005 and its first phase was completed by autumn 2007. It covered 1.4 km and is served by four CAF Urbos trams.

== History ==
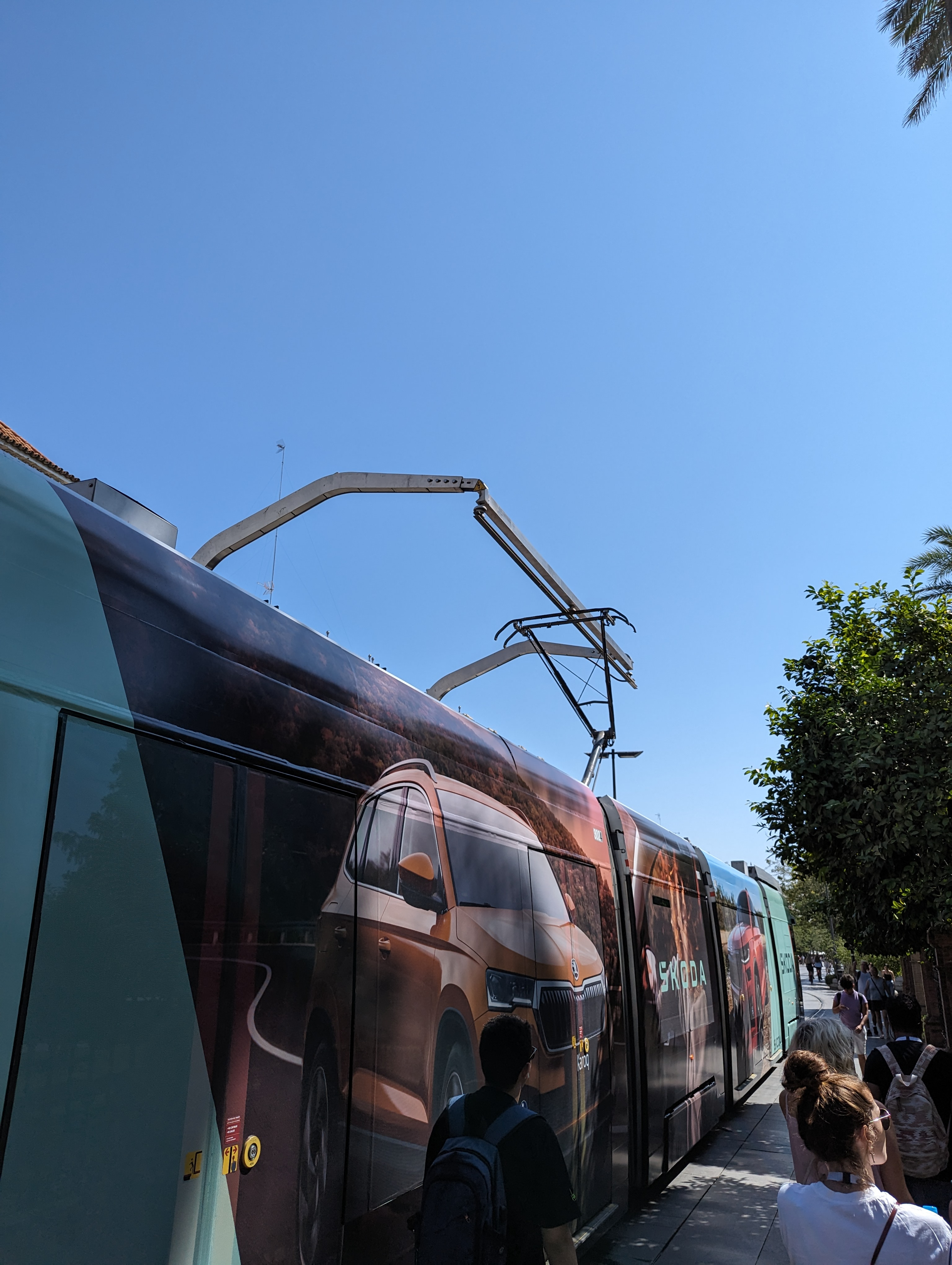
An Urbos 3 tram recharging its supercapacitors at the Puerta de Jerez station

Seville had already built a long tram system in 1887, but it was dismantled in the 1960s due to financial problems and safety reasons.

The current tram system was planned in 2004, when Seville City Council announced that it would pedestrianize the city center to reduce high pollution, increase pedestrian spaces and promote sustainable mobility in the area. These plans met with the opposition of drivers and merchants, so the City Council decided to create a new tram system, with works starting in 2006.

The tram was to be inaugurated on 24 September 2007. However, due to safety reasons, this event was delayed to 28 October. The tram originally covered the route between Plaza Nueva and Prado de San Sebastián.

On 15 April 2011, the tram was expanded to San Bernardo.

From the start it was envisaged that part of the Metrocentro system should be able to run free from using the overhead contact wire for power. The city had initially forecast that the catenaries would be removed from the area surrounding the cathedral by 2008. On several occasions, the City Council had to dismantle the overhead wires to allow, at Easter, processions to pass without restriction; the builder of the rolling stock paid the extra cost for this. These catenaries were finally removed in late 2014.

Initially, the system operated using the vehicles of the Seville Metro, which did not start operating until 2009. The final system, which is in use since the Holy Week 2011, uses a technology called ACR (Acumulador de Carga Rápida), which are fast charging batteries that were developed and patented by CAF.

== Expansion plans ==
By the end of the 2010s, Seville City Council planned an expansion to Seville-Santa Justa, the most important station of the city. This would connect the tram with high-speed rail and commuter trains. The plan was met with controversy, since it required tree felling and the expansion would take the same route as Seville Metro.

The expansion works started on 9 March 2022. It had an estimated time of construction of 12 months. However, by late 2022, it was announced that deadlines wouldn't be met due to several problems in the excavation of the tunnel under San Francisco Javier avenue.

In December 2023, CAF announced that the new trains that were being manufactured wouldn't be ready until late 2024, so Seville City Council started testing the new expansion with old trains. A few months later, in March 2024, catenaries were removed between Prado de San Sebastián and San Fernando street, thanks to improved rapid energy accumulation systems during stops.

On 19 June 2024, two new stops were inaugurated: San Francisco Javier and Eduardo Dato. Since the CAF trains hadn't still arrived, frequency rose to 20 minutes. On 16 November, two new trains were tested for the system, entering into service two days later, on 18 November, allowing frequencies of 8 minutes. That same day, Luis de Morales stop was inaugurated.

Two more stops are planned: Kansas City avenue and Seville-Santa Justa.
