= Nervión, Seville =

District of Seville, Spain

Coordinates: 37.3856°N 5.9726°W

Nervión is a district of Seville, Spain. It lies to the east of the city centre (the Casco Antiguo), to the north of the Distrito Sur, to the south of San Pablo-Santa Justa and to the west of Cerro-Amate.

The district is an important commercial district of the city, where much of the regional capital's business takes place. The population is 16,129 inhabitants.

== History ==
Remains of the Roman aqueduct

Prior to 1911, most of Nervión was cultivated land with multiple cotton plantations. The land was owned by the Marques of Nervión, who donated it to the city. A few structures did exist in the zone, however, including a penitentiary, Sevilla 1, which still stands, albeit out of use and in the process of historical renovation. At the time, the Roman Aqueduct known as The Pipes of Carmona was still supplying fresh water to the city as it had for nearly two thousand years. The aqueduct was demolished to make space for development, beginning in 1912. Three small sections of the aqueduct still stand along Calle Luis Montoto and Calle Cigüeña in Sevilla.

Development of Nervión began in 1911, comprising what was then an outskirt of the city with plans centering on the Gran Plaza. The architect in charge of the planning and development was renowned Spanish architect Anibal Gonzalez, who designed many other famous structures in Seville and the rest of Andalusia.

In the 1920s and 1930s, many low-level villa-style houses surrounded by gardens were built in the area. Large high-rise apartment buildings were built in the 1960s. Since the 1980s and 1990s, construction has been mainly of hotels, shopping centres and office buildings. It is presently a highly developed, modern suburb of Seville.

== Sites ==
It is the second focal point of the city, and is home to a number of important sites:

View of Estadio Ramón Sánchez Pizjuán

- Santa Justa, Seville's major train station, with high-speed links via the AVE to Madrid, Córdoba, and Cádiz.
- Estadio Ramón Sánchez Pizjuán, home to Sevilla FC, one of Seville's two association football clubs in La Liga. The area's name is the origin of one of Sevilla's nicknames, Los Nervionenses.
- Nervión Plaza, a commercial shopping complex with many chain stores and a large cinema with 20 screens.
- El Prado, a gardened zone that serves as a major short-distance bus hub.
- Estación de Cádiz, the lesser of the city's two trains stations. It currently serves as a fresh produce market.

The Facultad de Ciencias Económicas y Empresariales (School of Business) of the University of Seville is located in this neighborhood.

The Seville Metro has four stations in the district: Prado, San Bernardo, Nervión and Gran Plaza. All of these are on Line 1, which became operational on 2 April 2009. The Prado station also connects to the planned Line 3, as well as the city's primary short-distance bus hub.

Many TUSSAM bus routes connect Nervión with other districts, as well as internally. These include circular lines such as the C1/C2 in addition to a number of other lines, such as the 27, that connect it with the historical centre, the Casco Antiguo.
