= Mairena del Aljarafe =

Coordinates: 37°20′N 6°04′W

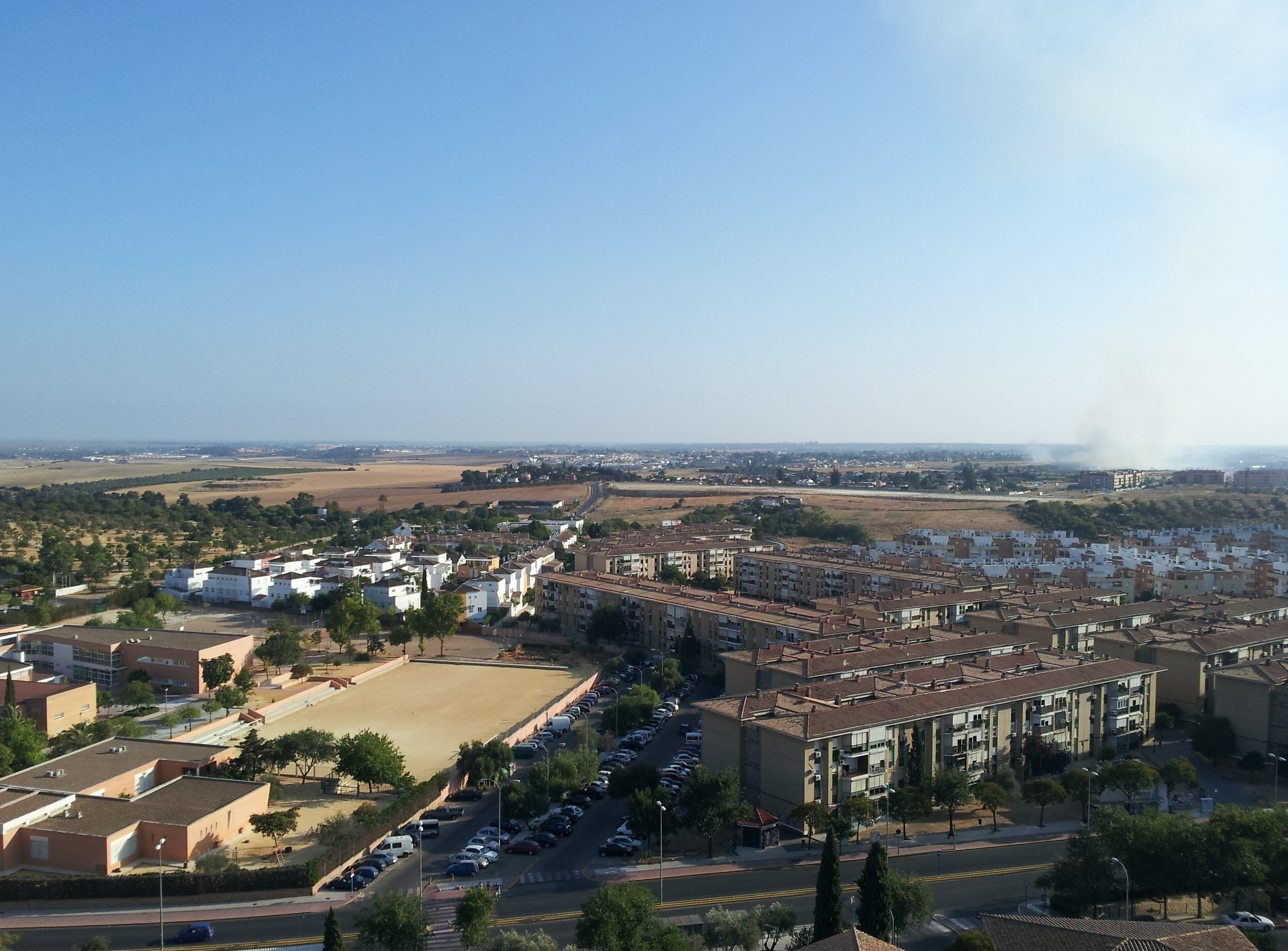
- View of Mairena del Aljarafe

- Flag Coat of arms

- Location in Spain.
- Country: Spain
- Autonomous community: Andalusia

Government
  - Alcalde: Antonio Conde (PSOE)

Area
  - Total: 17.70 km^{2} (6.83 sq mi)
- Elevation: 85 m (279 ft)

Population (2025-01-01)
  - Total: 48,017
  - Density: 2,713/km^{2} (7,026/sq mi)
- Time zone: UTC+1 (CET)
  - Summer (DST): UTC+2 (CEST)
- Website: www.mairenadelaljarafe.es

Mairena del Aljarafe (Spanish pronunciation: [majˈɾena ðel alxaˈɾafe]) is a municipality in the province of Seville, Spain. In 2009, it had a population of 40,700 inhabitants. Its superficial extension is 17.7 km^{2} (6.83 sq. mi.) and has a population density of 2,470.23 inhabitants/km^{2}.

== Notable people ==
- Carlitos (born 1976), retired professional footballer
- Javi Díaz (born 1997), professional footballer
- Gemeliers (born 1999), singer brothers
- Rosa Márquez (born 2000), professional footballer
- Antonio Romero (born 1995), footballer

== See also ==
- List of municipalities in Seville
