= Dos Hermanas =

- Municipality
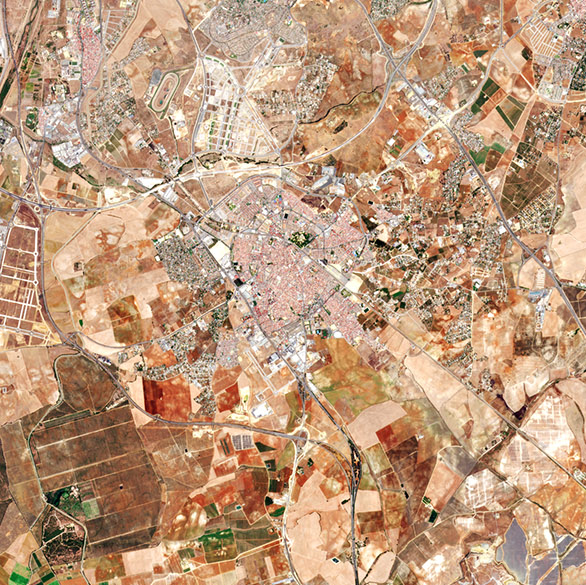
- Satellite view of Dos Hermanas

- Flag Coat of arms
- Interactive map of Dos Hermanas
- Coordinates: 37°17′1″N 5°55′20″W
- Country: Spain
- Autonomous community: Andalusia
- Judicial district: Dos Hermanas
- Founded: 1404 (first documented)

Government
  - Alcalde: Francisco Rodríguez García (PSOE)

Area
  - Total: 159.80 km^{2} (61.70 sq mi)
- Elevation: 42 m (138 ft)

Population (2024)
  - Total: 140,463
  - Density: 878.99/km^{2} (2,276.6/sq mi)
- Demonym: Nazareno/a
- Time zone: UTC+1 (CET)
  - Summer (DST): UTC+2 (CEST)
- Postal code: 41700 to 41704 and 41089 (Montequinto)
- Website: Official website

Dos Hermanas (Spanish pronunciation: [ˈdos eɾˈmanas], "two sisters") is a city and municipality in the autonomous community of Andalusia in Spain. It is part of the Seville metropolitan area, lying 15 km (9.3 mi) south of the city of Seville. With a population of 140,463 as of 2024, it is the second-largest municipality in the Province of Seville, the 9th-largest in Andalusia and 50th-largest in Spain.

== History ==
The town’s name, which means "two sisters", dates from its founding in 1248 by King Ferdinand III of Castile and honours Elvira and Estefanía Nazareno, the two sisters of Gonzalo Nazareno, one of the king's principal military commanders. For this reason natives of Dos Hermanas are called nazarenos/as.

In Tirso de Molina's play The Trickster of Seville and the Stone Guest (El burlador de Sevilla y convidado de piedra) (1612-1620), Dos Hermanas is mentioned as the place where Don Juan Tenorio manages to interpose himself in the marriage of two plebeians, Arminta and Batricio, whom he cleverly deceives. The Trickster of Seville and Stone Guest is the play from which the myth of "Don Juan" derives the name.

== Demographics ==
As of 2024, the foreign-born population is 7,015, equal to 5.0% of the total population. The 5 largest foreign nationalities are Moroccans (690), Colombians (666), Venezuelans (522), Germans (374) and Argentinians (357).

Historical population

Year	Pop.	±%
1842	3,498	—
1857	4,692	+34.1%
1877	5,652	+20.5%
1887	6,472	+14.5%
1900	7,779	+20.2%
1910	9,887	+27.1%
1920	10,996	+11.2%
1930	15,128	+37.6%
1940	18,919	+25.1%

Year	Pop.	±%
1950	21,049	+11.3%
1960	27,505	+30.7%
1970	39,677	+44.3%
1981	57,548	+45.0%
1991	78,025	+35.6%
2001	101,988	+30.7%
2011	128,433	+25.9%
2021	136,296	+6.1%

Source: INE

Foreign population by country of birth (2024)
Country	Population
Morocco	690
Colombia	666
Venezuela	522
Germany	374
Argentina	357
Paraguay	341
France	318
China	274
Nicaragua	252
Peru	218
Brazil	209
Cuba	180
Romania	174
Ecuador	170
Dominican Republic	141

== Economy ==
The main economic activities of the city today are the production and distribution of olive oil and "Spanish olives", together with a significant number of service industries.

== Transmitter ==
At Dos Hermanas, south of Los Palacios (geographical coordinates: 37°12′35″N 5°55′33″W), there is a powerful broadcasting mediumwave facility with a 232-metre-tall (761 ft) guyed mast, used for the transmission of the first program of RNE with 300 kW on 684 kHz. The transmitter, which is most often designated as "RNE-1 Sevilla" can be received easily at night throughout Europe and northern Africa.

== Transport ==
The main area of the city is crossed by the Cercanías Sevilla commuter-rail, with lines C-1 and C-5 serving the area. The district of Montequinto has 4 stations of Seville Metro, connecting the city to the capital of the province.

== Sports ==
The town's football club, Dos Hermanas CF, was founded in 1971. It plays in the Primera Andaluza, the highest league in the region. It has had four spells playing in national leagues, including the third tier, the Segunda B, between 1999 and 2002. It returned to regional football in 2010.

Dos Hermanas has hosted an annual chess tournament since 1989.

== Notable people ==
The members of Spanish lounge music duo Los del Río (known for their song "Macarena") are natives of Dos Hermanas and still reside in the city.

Spanish popstar Melody comes from Dos Hermanas. In 2014, a controversy was sparked when an interviewer for Cuatro TV asked her about her polished accent 'despite being from Dos Hermanas', leading to debate on classism and Madrid-centric snobbery regarding Andalusian accents. Melody represented Spain at the Eurovision Song Contest 2025, coming in 24th place.

== See also ==
- List of municipalities in Seville
