= Ciudad Expo (Seville Metro) =

Seville Metro station

General information
- Location: Av. de los Descubrimientos, Mairena del Aljarafe; Andalusia, Spain
- Coordinates: 37°20′58″N 6°03′05″W
- Platforms: 1 Island platform, 65 m long, with platform screen doors
- Tracks: 2

Construction
- Structure type: Ground
- Accessible: Yes

Other information
- Fare zone: 0

History
- Opened: 2 April 2009; 17 years ago

Services
Preceding station	Seville Metro	Following station
Terminus	Line 1	Cavaleri towards Olivar de Quintos
Location

Ciudad Expo (English: Expo City) is one of the two end point stations of Seville Metro on the line 1. It will also be a tram stop of the Aljarafe tram line. Ciudad Expo is a ground station located in the avenue of Los Descubrimientos in the municipality of Mairena del Aljarafe. It was opened on 2 April 2009.

== Connections ==
Bus: M-101, M-150, M-151, M-152, M-153, M-155
Tram: Aljarafe tram

== See also ==
- List of Seville metro stations
