= Olivar de Quintos (Seville Metro) =

Seville Metro station

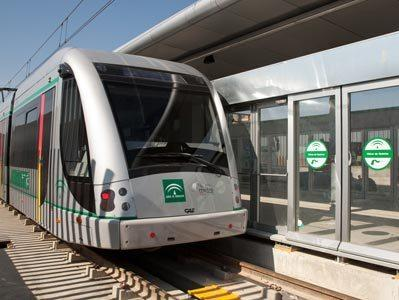

General information
- Location: Montequinto Av., Dos Hermanas; Andalusia, Spain
- Coordinates: 37°19′55″N 5°56′09″W
- Platforms: 1 Island platform, 65 m long with platform screen doors
- Tracks: 2
- Connections: Bus: M-123, M-130; Tram: Dos Hermanas tram

Construction
- Structure type: Ground
- Accessible: Yes

Other information
- Fare zone: 2

History
- Opened: 23 November 2009; 16 years ago

Services
Preceding station	Seville Metro	Following station
Europa towards Ciudad Expo	Line 1	Terminus
Location

Olivar de Quintos is one of the two end point stations of Seville Metro on the line 1. It will also be a tram stop of the Dos Hermanas tram line. Olivar de Quintos is a ground station located in the avenue of Montequinto in the municipality of Dos Hermanas, Seville. It was opened on 23 November 2009.

== See also ==
- List of Seville metro stations
