= Seville Metro =

Light metro network in Seville, Spain

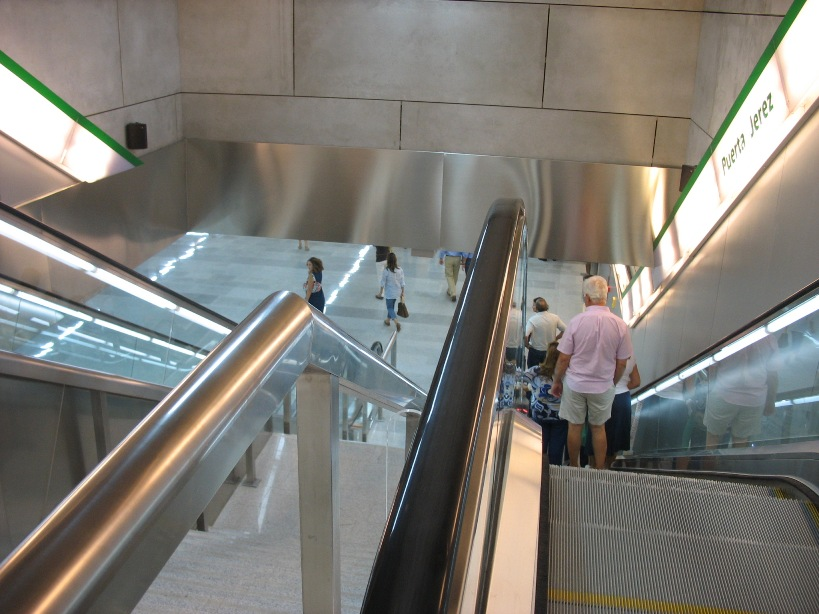
- Puerta Jerez station

Overview
- Native name: Metro de Sevilla
- Owner: Autonomous Government of Andalusia
- Locale: Seville, Andalusia, Spain
- Transit type: Light metro
- Number of lines: 1 finished 1 in construction 2 planned
- Number of stations: 22
- Daily ridership: 64,279 (2025)
- Annual ridership: 23.4 million (2025)
- Website: Metro Sevilla (in Spanish)

Operation
- Began operation: 2 April 2009; 17 years ago
- Operator: Metro de Sevilla Sociedad Concesionaria de la Junta de Andalucía S.A.
- Number of vehicles: 21 CAF Urbos 2

Technical
- System length: 18 km (11 mi)
- Track gauge: 1,435 mm (4 ft 8 1/2 in) standard gauge
- Electrification: 750 V DC overhead catenary
- Top speed: 70 km/h (43 mph)
System map

The Seville Metro (Spanish: Metro de Sevilla) is an 18-kilometre (11 mi) light metro network serving the city of Seville, Spain and its metropolitan area. The system is totally independent of any other rail or street traffic. All stations have platform screen doors.

Line 1 was inaugurated on 2 April 2009. Three more lines are planned to be built. Construction of Line 3 began in February 2023 and is expected to be completed in 2030.

The Seville Metro fleet consists of 21 articulated low-floor Urbos 2 light rail vehicles (LRVs) manufactured by CAF. The Urbos 2 LRVs are 31 metres (101 ft 8 1/2 in) long, 2.65 metres (8 ft 8 3/8 in) wide, and 3.3 metres (10 ft 9 7/8 in) tall, with a total 6 doors on each side. The capacity of each LRV vehicle is of 192 passengers, of which 60 would be seated and 132 standing. The Urbos 2 LRVs have air conditioning. LRVs are powered by an overhead catenary at 750 V DC.

It was the sixth Metro system to be built in Spain, after those in Madrid, Barcelona, Valencia, Bilbao and Palma de Mallorca. Currently, it is the fifth busiest Metro system in Spain by number of passengers carried – over 23.4 million passengers in 2025.

== History ==
=== First attempt ===
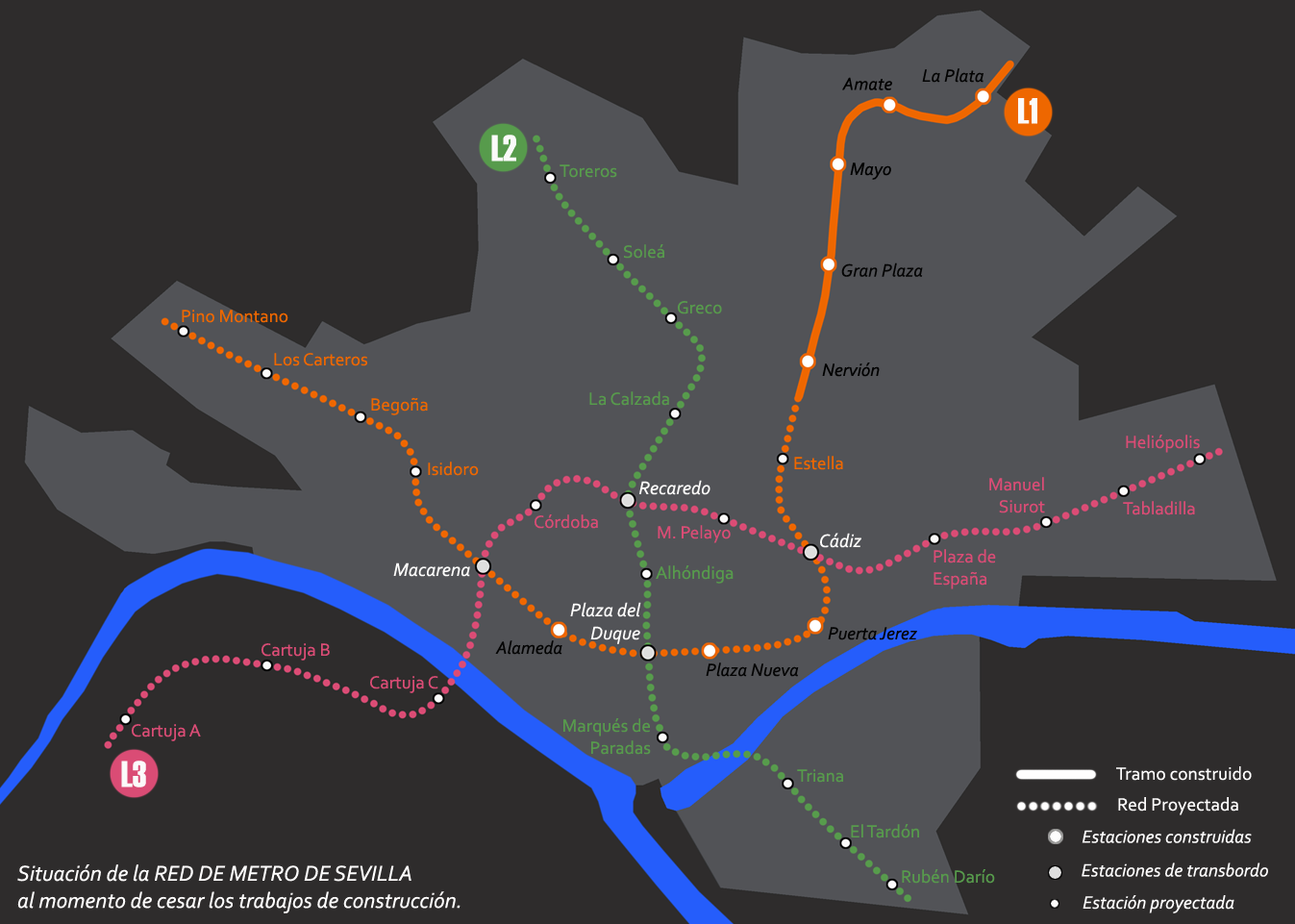
First metro project

In 1968, during the Franco dictatorship, the City Council of Seville already stated that surface transportation was insufficient to meet the mobility demands of citizens due to the growing development of private transport in the area. The Council proposed to build a metro system in the following decade. Seville was then the third Spanish city to plan the construction of a metro-system, after Madrid and Barcelona, which already had metro systems in operation for decades.

On 30 July 1969, the City Council approved a study that received support from the Ministry of Public Works. The Ministry then put out a tender for the drafting of the project, which was selected in September 1972. This first project proposed that the network length would be 27.2 km with 32 stations in three lines, covering only the city of Seville:

- Line 1: La Plata, Puerta Jerez, Plaza Nueva, Plaza del Duque, Alameda, Macarena, Pino Montano.
- Line 2: Santa Clara, Polígono San Pablo, Alhóndiga, Plaza del Duque, Marqués de Paradas, El Tardón, Rubén Darío.
- Line 3: Heliópolis, San Bernardo, Menéndez y Pelayo, Recaredo, Macarena, Cartuja.

==== Start of construction and increasing problems ====
Experimental construction began in mid-1974, with definitive construction beginning in April 1976. Franco had died on 20 November 1975, changing the political environment from a dictatorship to one of increasing free expression and democracy, including the ability to publicly express concerns about the ongoing metro construction. On 4 November 1981, the monument to San Fernando in Plaza Nueva sank, raising concerns among citizens. A few months later, on 28 March 1982, a 5 metres (16 ft) sinkhole appeared in Puerta Jerez station, and later that year, some cracks appeared in several buildings in the San Bernardo neighborhood.

==== Increasing public opposition ====
Popular local newspapers such as the right-leaning ABC de Sevilla campaigned against the construction of the metro, citing the system as a threat for historical buildings and monuments because of the "fragile characteristics of the Sevillian soil". Numerous posters against the construction of the Metro were seen throughout the city during these years.

==== Suspension of works ====
These events sparked public alarm and signalled a shift in popular opinion against the metro project, leading to the suspension of the works in 1984 in the midst of a budget restructuring of the newly created PSOE-led Junta de Andalucía (established under the 1981 Statute of Autonomy), which preferred to build other, more popular infrastructure projects in Andalusia.

By the time the works were suspended, more than 5 billion pesetas (€30 million in 1984, €115 million if inflation is adjusted to 2025) had already been invested. Only 3 stations of Line 1 had been built, with a total length of 3 kilometres (1.9 mi).

=== Second attempt and opening ===
==== Renewed political discussions ====
In 1999, fifteen years after the works were halted, PSOE and Partido Andalucista reached an agreement to reactivate construction, citing technological advances and considerable population growth as the reasons. A new study project was ordered by the Junta de Andalucía, planning a network covering Seville and its metropolitan area (over 1.5 million inhabitants) formed by four lines, all of them, completely independent of other traffic.

The Junta de Andalucía finally approved the project in 2003, with the aim of promoting railway systems in various areas of Andalusia. Along the Seville Metro, the Andalusian Government also planned the construction of Málaga Metro (opened 2014), Granada Metro (2017), Cádiz Bay tram-train (2022) and Jaén Tram (yet to be inaugurated).

==== Restarting construction ====
Construction of Line 1 began in September 2003, starting with the rehabilitation of the flooded Nervion station, whose works were halted 25 years prior. The line was scheduled to be completed in 2006, but construction was only halfway compete by that point in time. In October 2007, the Metrocentro tram system was inaugurated. The Junta de Andalucía temporarily transferred five Urbos 2 trams to TUSSAM (operator of city buses and MetroCentro) since the metro system was not yet operatiobal. A few months later, TUSSAM bought the trams, which were eventually brought back to their manufacturer, CAF, and sold once again to the Seville Metro in 2010.

==== Opening ====
The inauguration day was expected to be 21 December 2008. However, on 27 November, a water filtration at Puerta Jerez station delayed the inauguration by three and a half months. Line 1 finally began operation on 2 April 2009.

=== Expansion ===
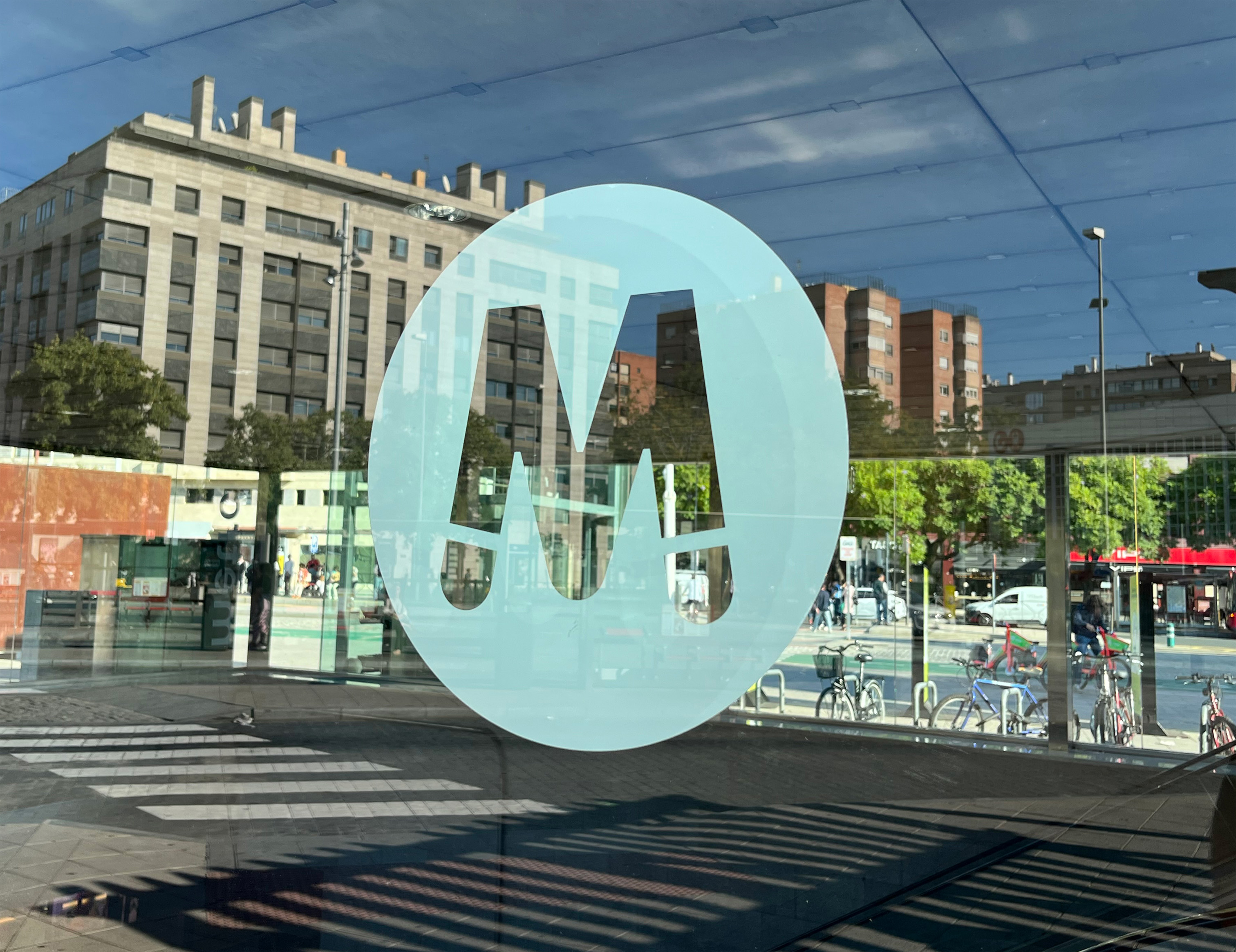
Station entrance detail

After Line 1 was inaugurated in 2009, Seville Metro projects were halted due to the 2008 financial crisis that severely struck Spain. Other metro networks in Spain, like Madrid Metro, which had been one of the fastest growing in Europe in the preceding decade and a half, also severely curtailed, delayed or outright cancelled expansion plans. Over the following years, projects for new metro lines in Seville were politically discussed but never proceeded to actual construction.

In 2018, government officials came to an agreement to build line 3 of the metro system next, as this line would only cross the city of Seville, thus requiring less permissions. Line 3 officially began construction in February 2023, although just the northern half of it, since the southern half still does not have an approved project. Line 3 is expected to be inaugurated in 2030.

== System ==
The Seville Metro system currently consists of one operational line (Line 1), one under construction (Line 3), and two others in various stages of planning and development (Lines 2 and 4).

Line	Color	Status	Name and Route	Year of opening	Current length (km)	Projected length (km)	Current stations	Projected stations
Seville Metro line 1	Green	Operational	Line 1 (Ciudad Expo ↔ Olivar de Quintos)	2009	18.1 km (11.2 mi)	=	21	1
Seville Metro line 2	Blue	In project	Line 2 (Torre Triana ↔ Aeronáutica)	TBD	0	13.4 km (8.3 mi)	0	17
Seville Metro line 3	Red	Under construction	Line 3 (Pino Montano Norte ↔ Hospital V. de Valme)	2030 (scheduled)	0	18.2 km (11.3 mi)	0	24
Seville Metro line 4	Yellow	Planned	Line 4 (Circular)	TBD	0	17.7 km (11.0 mi)	0	24
Total:					18.1	49.3	21	66

=== Operational ===
==== Line 1 ====
Route of line 1

Line 1 of Seville Metro crosses the southern part of Seville metropolitan area, starting at Ciudad Expo station in Mairena del Aljarafe. The end of the line is Olivar de Quintos in Montequinto, a neighborhood of Dos Hermanas. The line crosses the busiest zones in Seville, including Puerta Jerez near Seville city center, San Bernardo, which is a transportation hub, and Nervión. The line also stops at Pablo de Olavide University, where it is expected to have a connection to the Alcalá de Guadaira tramway in 2026. In 2019 the busiest stations on Line 1 were Puerta Jerez (2,139,000), San Bernardo (1,393,000) and Nervión (1,385,000).

- Line West-South
  - Status: Operational
  - Cities: Mairena del Aljarafe, San Juan de Aznalfarache, Seville, Dos Hermanas
  - Construction: September 2003 - April 2009
  - Licence holder: Grupo ACS, Grupo SyV, GEA 21, AOPJA, CAF

=== In development ===
==== Line 2 ====
Planned route of line 2

Line 2 of Seville Metro is a planned east–west line that will connect the neighborhoods of La Cartuja and Torreblanca. The line will run underground, passing through key locations such as Sevilla Este, Santa Justa railway station, Plaza del Duque, and Plaza de Armas bus station, before crossing the river to Torre Triana. The line is considered strategically important, as it will provide a direct link between the Plaza de Armas international bus station and the Santa Justa high-speed rail (AVE) station, with some sections expected to reach depths of over 50 meters (160 ft) below terrain. As of 2024, construction has been on hold due to lack of funding. Seville is seeking EU financial support to begin work. Current plans also propose an extension along the A-49 highway, adding five stations: Camas, Airesur, Nueva Sevilla, Bormujos-Gines, and Hospital de San Juan de Dios.

- Line East-West
  - Status: In project
  - Cities: Seville, Camas, Bormujos, Gines
  - Construction: TBD
  - Licence holder: TBD

==== Line 3 ====
Planned route of line 3

Line 3 of Seville Metro is a planned north-south line currently under construction. It will connect Pino Montano in the north with Bellavista in the south, passing through key locations such as Hospital V. Macarena, Prado de San Sebastián, Plaza de España, Hospital V. del Rocío, Estadio Benito Villamarín. The line aims to improve access to major hospitals, universities, and transport hubs, significantly enhancing mobility in the city. Construction began in 2023, with completion expected by 2030. Once completed, Line 3 will be the second operational metro line in Seville and is expected to serve a high-demand corridor, reducing road congestion and promoting sustainable urban transport. Future plans include potential connections with Lines 2 and 4, further integrating the metro network.

- Line North-South
  - Status: Under construction
  - Cities: Seville.
  - Construction: February 2023 - 2030 (scheduled)
  - Licence holder: TBD

==== Line 4 ====
Planned route of line 4

Line 4 of Seville Metro is a proposed circular line that would encircle the city, connecting all other metro lines and improving overall network integration. The line is designed to facilitate transfers between lines 1, 2, and 3, enhancing connectivity between key districts, residential areas, and major transport hubs. It is expected to serve high-traffic areas, reducing congestion and offering a more efficient public transportation alternative.

Currently, Line 4 remains in the planning phase, with no official timeline for construction. The project is considered essential for completing the metro system, as it would provide greater accessibility across Seville and its metropolitan area. If built, it would function similarly to circular metro lines in other major cities, allowing for faster, more direct travel between different parts of the city without requiring passage through the center.

- Line Circular
  - Status: Planned
  - Cities: Seville
  - Construction: TBD
  - Licence holder: TBD

== Fares ==
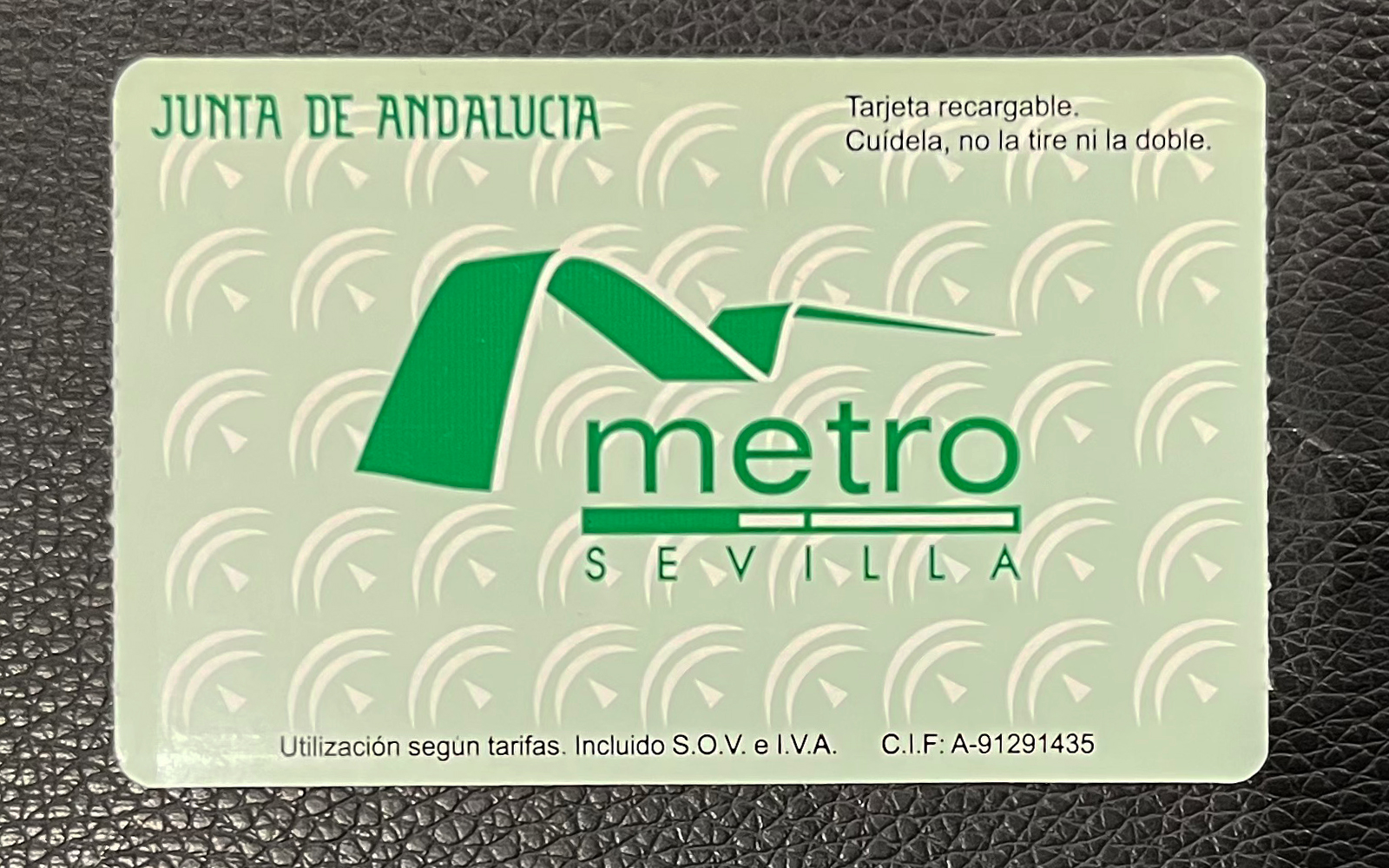
Seville Metro card

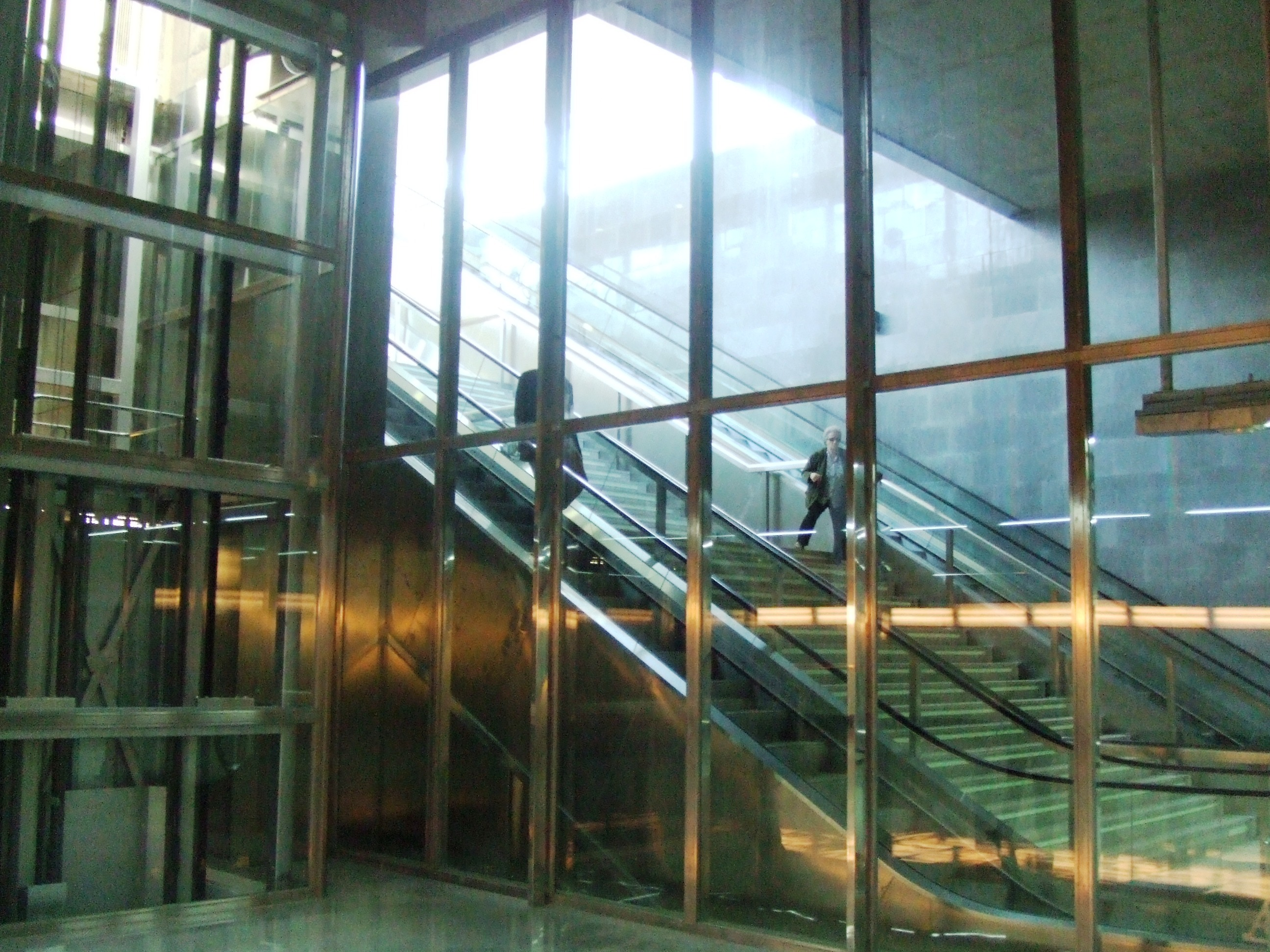
San Bernardo station

There are several payment methods that can be used in the metro facilities.

- An exclusive Seville Metro ticket: they can be bought at automated ticket machines in stations.
- A Seville Metro card
- A multimodal card of the Transport Consortium of any Metropolitan Area of Andalusia.
- Bank card using the Tap&Go system.

Seville Metro fees
Method	0 zones	1 zone	2 zones
Single ticket	1,35 €	1,60 €	1,80 €
Round trip ticket	2,70 €	3,20 €	3,60 €
1-day ticket Unlimited trips in a single day	4,50 €
Bonoplus45; 45 trips in 30 days, sole proprietorship	0,66 € (30€); 0,26€ (12€)*	0,94 € (42€); 0,37€ (17€)*	1,10 € (50€); 0,44€ (20€)*
Bonometro (Seville Metro card)	0,82 € 0,33 €*	1,17 € 0,47 €*	1,37 € 0,55 €*
Transport Consortium Card**	0,82 € 0,33 €*	1,17 € 0,47 €*	1,37 € 0,55 €*
*Provisional prices from January 2025 to June 2025. **This payment option allows the user to transfer between different means of transport in the metropolitan area, discounting 20% of the total amount of the means used within a period of 2 hours.

== Corporate identity ==
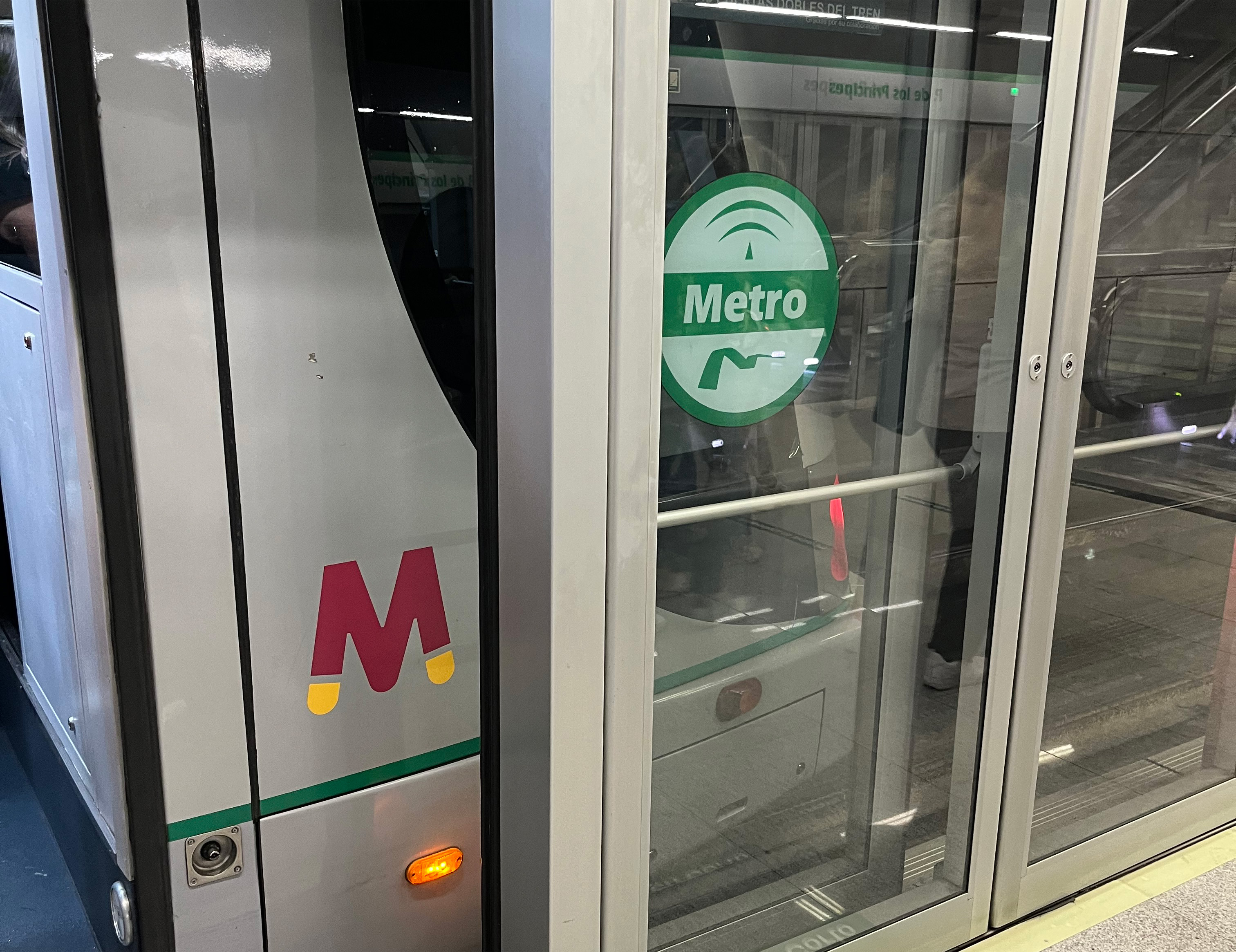
Current and old Seville Metro logos

The corporate identity of the Seville Metro has undergone a significant revamp since its inauguration in 2009. The original design, along with its various adaptations, remained in use until 2024, when a broader update of the system's signage prompted a revision of its visual identity, including modifications to the logo and corporate colors.

=== Current logo ===
Current Metro logo

The current logo, introduced in October 2024, features a bold, open-stroke uppercase "M" in carmine red and albero yellow, colors traditionally associated with Seville’s chromatic identity. Next to the "M", the word "metro" appears in lowercase and bold, while beneath it, "SEVILLA" is written in uppercase; both words are in anthracite gray.

The 2024 redesign aims to enhance readability and reinforce the metro system's visual identity, creating a clearer and more cohesive brand image. Through its color scheme, the new identity seeks to strengthen the connection between the metro and the city, reflecting its integration into the urban environment and improving recognition among residents.

=== Old logo ===
The original logo of the Seville Metro was selected through a public competition and depicted a stylized silhouette of the Guadalquivir river using a metallic, undulating sheet with gray gradients, forming a lowercase "m". Below this figure, the word "metro" in bold and "SEVILLA" in uppercase were separated by a thick stripe in carmine red, albero yellow, and green, symbolizing a fusion of the flags of Seville and Andalusia. Over time, as signage needs evolved, the logo was increasingly used in a monochrome green version, always displayed alongside the logo of the Andalusian Regional Government at the time.

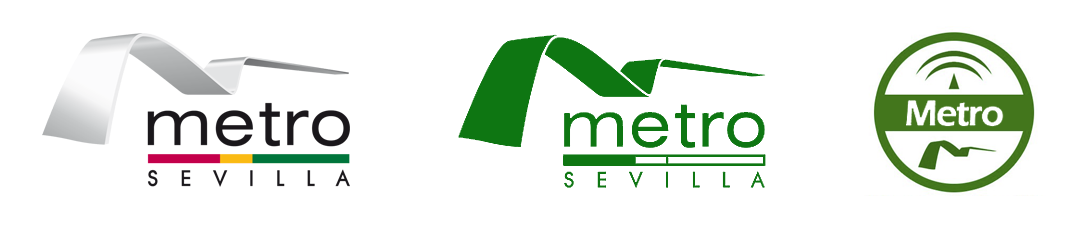
Evolution of the old Seville's metro logo (2009-2024)

== See also ==
- MetroCentro (Seville) (i.e. Seville tramway)
- Renfe, operator of the commuter train system of Seville.
- Light metro
