= Macarena Gate =

City gate of the original walls of Seville

Coordinates: 37.4028°N 5.9892°W

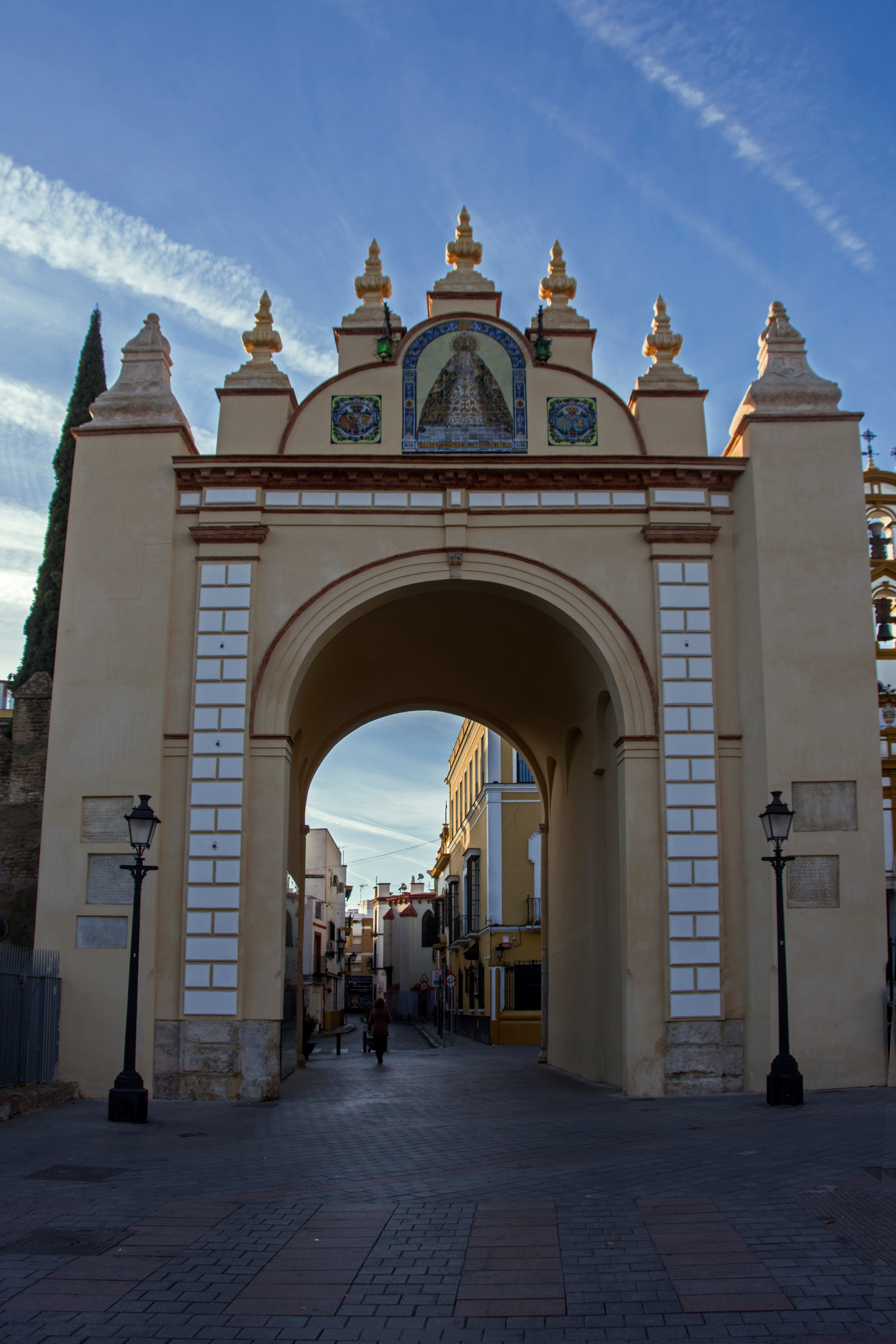
Puerta de la Macarena was one of the gates of the Walls of Seville after its restoration.

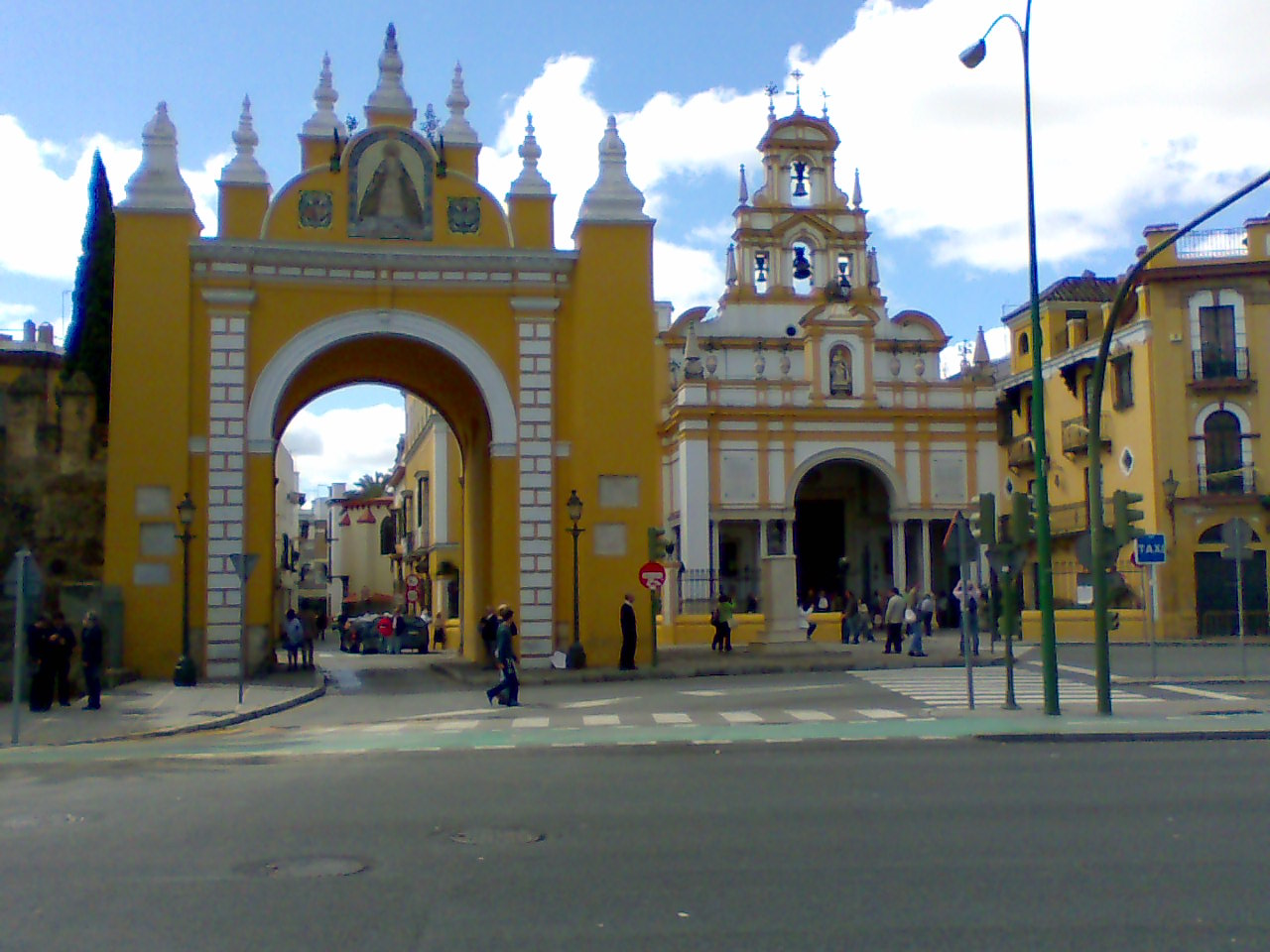
Puerta de la Macarena at left and Basílica de la Macarena at right, before its restoration

The Macarena Gate (Puerta de la Macarena, in Arabic: Bab-al-Makrin), also known as the Macarena Arch (Arco de la Macarena), is one of three city gates that remain today of the original walls of Seville, alongside the Oil Postern and the Córdoba Gate. It is located on Resolana street, within the San Gil neighborhood, which belongs to the district of Casco Antiguo of the city of Seville, in Andalusia, Spain.

The gate faces the Basilica of La Macarena, which houses the image of the Our Lady of la Esperanza Macarena, one of the most characteristic images of the Holy Week in Seville.

This is the northernmost entrance to the city's walls and the largest of the set. It is one of the few remaining remnants of the original city walls, along with the section of wall that connects it to the Córdoba Gate, in which seven towers are preserved.

Although the city's walled enclosure was originally built during the time of Julius Caesar (replacing earlier Carthaginian defenses), the gate itself dates to the 12th-century expansion ordered by the sultan Ali ibn Yusuf. Its current appearance results from extensive remodeling between 1723 and 1795, during which the original Islamic architectural elements were replaced with a classicist style.

This gate was traditionally used by kings entering the city for the first time. Before its walls stood an altar where visiting kings would perform a symbolic act of homage, after which they were presented with the keys to the city. This ceremony was performed by: Alfonso XI of Castile (1327), Isabella I of Castile (1477), Ferdinand II of Aragon (1508), Charles V, Holy Roman Emperor and his fiancée Isabella of Portugal (1526), and finally Philip IV (1624).

The Macarena Gate crowns the ceramic altarpiece created by painter Manuel Rodríguez, which depicts the Virgin of Hope of Macarena and was inaugurated in 1923 by Infanta Maria de la Esperanza of Bourbon–Two Sicilies.

The remains of the walled city, which includes this gate, were declared Bien de Interés Cultural in 1985.

== Location and toponym ==
The gate is located in what was the arrabal de la Macarena was the access of the walled enclosure which was further north of the city and from where started the old mule to Extremadura. Its cloth of wall joined to one side with Puerta de Carmona and to the other with the Puerta de Córdoba, being located in this last stretch the Torre Blanca. Today it is located on Resolana street, against the Basílica de La Macarena and near the Hospital de las Cinco Llagas (home of Parliament of Andalusia), in the San Gil neighborhood and District Casco Antiguo.

There are several theories about the origin of the word Macarena, and the historians do not agree. The farthest proposals attributed to the word a Greek origin, being attached to the name of Macaria, daughter of Hercules, founder of the city. There is also a hypothesis of its Roman origin, specifically of a patrician called Macarius, which would have had great properties in the area, Finally, the closest option and most common among historians is to its Arab origin, through a Moor princess who lived next to the wall, or of a Moor of the same name, as recounted in 1587 writer Alonso Morgado in his Historia de Sevilla:

that the Puerta de la Macarena took its name from main Moor called Macarena, because he was leaving he for this gate to his inheritance half legua from Seville, where even today remains a turret named Macarena of the name of this Moor, who built on that his membership. And for still the same reason it is also called today Collado de la Cabeça de Macarena, in the way of la Rinconada, town of that time a legua from Seville

(written in Medieval Spanish)

This Arab option seems to corroborate it the existence of qaryat Maqrana (the alqueria of Macarena), attached to the itinerary called Mamarr al-Sabila (the way of the travelers) which consisted of the self alqueria and a fortified tower, and was in the current Orchard de la Torrecilla, next to the cemetery of San Fernando.

== History ==
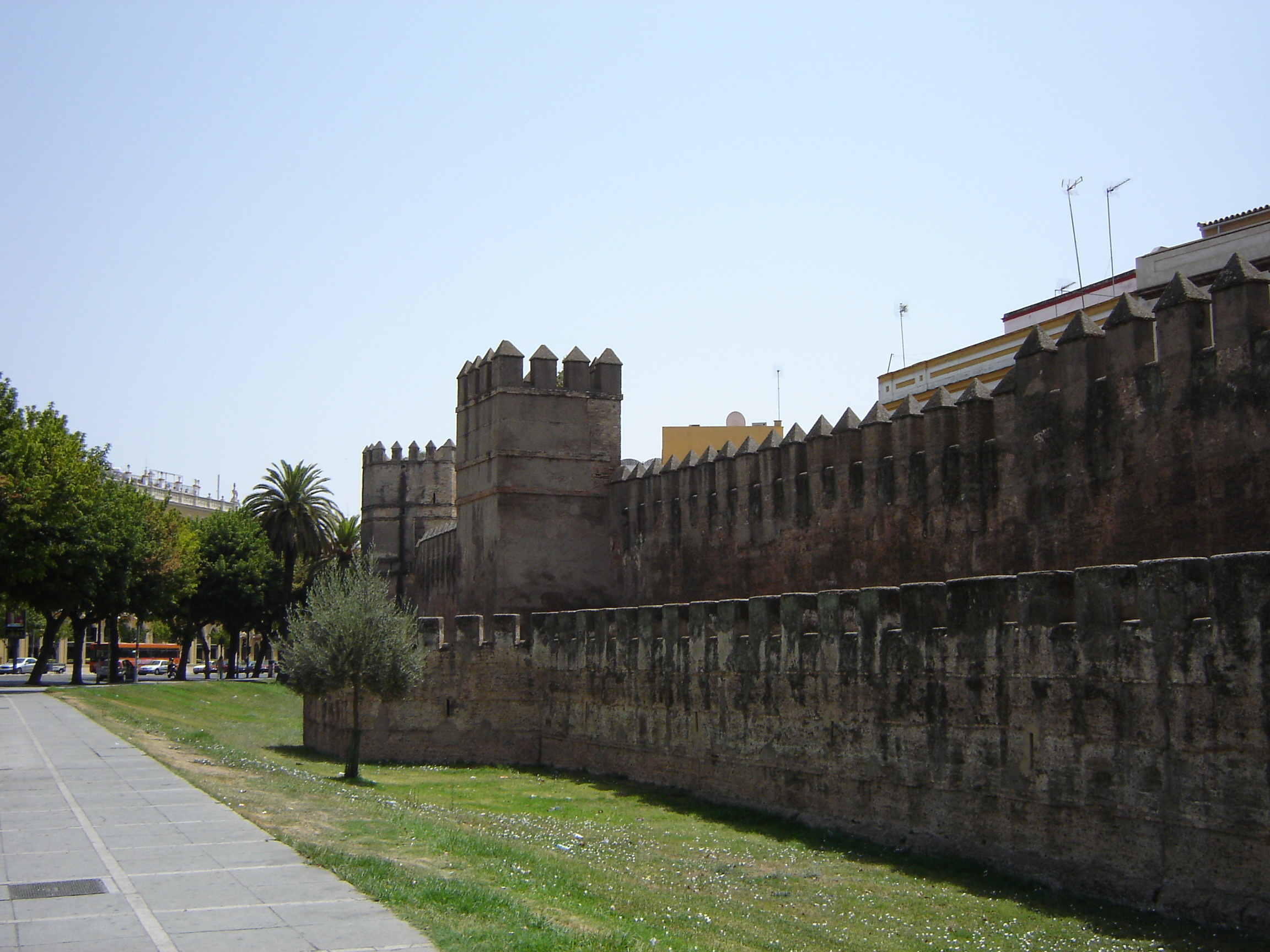
Cloth of wall in barrio La Macarena, one of the two canvases preserved from the walled enclosure throughout the city

=== 12th-15th centuries ===
The walls of Seville were built in the time of Julius Caesar to replace the Carthaginian stockade that existed, and were expanded during the rule of his successor Augustus. Later in the 12th century the Arabs carried out a major expansion that doubled the walled enclosure under the rule of Sultan Ali ibn Yusuf. The Puerta de la Macarena corresponds to the Almoravid period of the city; it is likely to have been created in this last extension of the set, although the historian Santiago Montoto de Sedas argues that this is, according to tradition, the only gate that remains of those built by Julius Caesar. Rodrigo Caro, citing the Etruscan discipline that says that each city had to have three gates of its walls dedicated to deities, argues that it arose in the time of Julius Caesar the Puerta de Goles (degeneration of Hercules), the Puerta del Sol (dedicated to the Sun god) and the Puerta de la Macarena, in honor of Macaria, daughter of Hercules.

The legend has it that one night, during the siege of the city, the king Ferdinand III of Castile, being in the camp set up outside the city walls, prayed to the Virgin of the Kings to ask for help, and it called by his name and told him: "you have a protective constant in my image of la Antigua, to which you want much and is in Seville", and she promised victory; then an angel made him enter the city until reach the main mosque, within which he was shown a wall which turned transparent as glass, and the king could see the image of the Virgin of la Antigua as it had been painted centuries ago. The chroniclers place the entrance of the king by the Puerta de Jerez, and boast that when the Christians learned that the monarch was in the city came to his aid Diego Lopez de Haro 7th lord of Biscay and Rodrigo González Girón, whose camps were facing the Puerta de la Macarena, and with other six knights entered the city for her; arrived at the main mosque, they had to confront the Muslims who discovered them, but they got out of the city and check that the king was already in the camp.

Subsequently, within the inheritances that Alfonso X of Castile granted the two hundred knights, are many close to the gate In 1358, entered through this gate the infante Don Fadrique, parent of the lineage of Enríquez, to die deceived in the city by order of his brother Peter of Castile, and in 1413 returned to his hometown fray Diego de Sevilla, who had been in the jerónimos de Guadalupe, and in following year carried out the foundation of monastery of San Jerónimo de Buenavista in an estate located outside the gate. Already during the reign of Henry IV of Castile had by the king, the gate Rodrigo de Ribera and farce of Avila caused it to be taken by the supporters of the infante Alfonso of Castile, although it was recovered by the henryquists soon after.

On July 24 of 1477 Queen Isabella I of Castile came to the city riding under a canopy of crimson brocade with dyed fringes, of greater magnitude and wealth than those used by her in her royal entries to date in other cities. Arrival at the Puerta de la Macarena at ten o'clock, on a silver altar swore to respect the privileges of the city and made her triumphal entrance to it through the gate. The arch was adorned with a cloth of brocade and crimson, and the event was attended by hundreds of people, not only the civil authorities of the city, but also the church, the aljama of Jews and Muslims and common people; King Ferdinand did not accompany his wife to be absent in Aragon. The Catholic Monarchs decided in 1491 that the cereal that came to the walled city from the outside, enter only through this gate and the Puerta de Triana and Puerta de Carmona, as picked up their rules "and that the bread thus draws out, entering the city of Seville through the puertas de Triana and de Carmona, and Macarena, and not through other gates".

=== 16th-18th centuries ===
In 1508 Ferdinand II of Aragon made his entry into the city through the gate, accompanied by Germaine of Foix, and for which were installed for the first time in Seville triumphal arches; in total were counted thirteen, that traveled in scenes the victories of the monarch His grandson the king Charles V, Holy Roman Emperor arrive on March 10 of 1526, was sworn in and made lawsuit tribute to the city at the gate, which came to it to celebrate his weddings with Isabella of Portugal. Seven triumphal arches were erected, to decorate the city for the lavish welcome, and the first of them stood behind this gate. It was dedicated to the caution, and over it appeared the emperor dressed in blue, a Latin inscription on the front and other in Castilian on the opposite, saying, "Honor that the Regiment and people of Seville makes to the Prudence, imperial virtue, first between all, because everyone made plain to the virtues that were with it, and showed in a short time fact what was once amazing". The Empress entered the city the next day, the bond was held, and also made through this gate, and was accompanied under a canopy to the cathedral.

When the king Philip II will make his first and only visit to the city in 1570, without the agreement of all, it was decided that, although historically its predecessors made their triumphal entrance through this gate, is to do for the Puerta de Goles, for the inconvenience, overview and state of the adjacent streets around la Macarena, so that was the only time that a monarch made no his entry for it, and the de Goles since then it renamed Puerta Real his grandson Philip IV returned the tradition of his predecessors, and the March 1 of 1624, after spending the night in Carmona, he made his public entry into the city through the gate, across the city to the Alcazar, being the only entry that made a Spanish monarch in the city throughout the 17th century. On 5 July of the same year Luis Fernández de Córdoba Portocarrero made his entrance into the city through this gate, the newly named Archbishop of Seville.

The Seville city council made purely aesthetic works in the Puerta de Jerez and in the Puerta de la Macarena, for which they sent a report to the king in 1561, who responded satisfactorily, insisting in the general tidying of the same and of its surroundings. So that year Pedro Hernández, overseer of the work of the Puerta de Jerez received from Pedro Milanés, a marbler, a stone for the Puerta de la Macarena, which cost 28 ducados. It was also amended the gate in 1630, when was installed a headstone on an ordinance intended to the gatekeepers, so not engaged in their duties out of it; the slab, which is preserved today embedded in the wall of the arch, says: "By provision of the King our lord of 20 September 1630 it banned to the guards not stay off the roads nor any other place to fulfill its obligation or move out of his gate, whose surveillance is subject to mister assistant, being delegated Mr. D. Diego de Ulloa. 1630". Shortly after, during the outbreak of plague that ravaged the city in 1646, six cemeteries were created in which to bury so many dead, settling one of them outside the gate. The gate must be then an object more of the popular culture of the city, as evidenced by the fact that the playwright Juan Pérez de Montalbán (1602–1638) wrote in the 17th century a comedy in two parts titled La puerta Macarena, displayed in the Corral de la Cruz of Madrid in 1717, and has as inspiration this gate.

In 1723 underwent a renovation by order of Alonso Pérez de Saavedra y Narváez, Count of la Jarosa, being mayor of the city, and in 1795 was rebuilt by the Sevillan architect José Chamorro, eliminating the Almohad appearance and bestowing the classicist air which currently has.

=== 19th-21st centuries ===
In 1836, during the invasion of Andalusia by the Carlist forces, was made a moat with drawbridge in order to strengthen the set. Possibly suffered damage during the conflict, and once completed was renovated, and it removed an altarpiece dedicated to Virgin of Sorrows that guarded inside, all prior to 1849, and was one of the gates that by then not closed at night. The July 17 of 1854 entered the city by this arc the general Leopoldo O'Donnell.

From the revolution of 1868, it began to tear down the city walls, which work ended in 1873. This measure did not affect the walls of the Macarena, which were saved by an allegation of the Commission of Monuments on its historical value that made them different from the rest, but the city council continued with the intention to make them disappear. In 1907 began a record on the opening of roads in the section of walls between the puerta de la Macarena and the puerta de Córdoba, and on November 1 of 1908 was declared a National Monument: "Office of transfer of the Ministry of Public Instruction and Fine Arts in which it communicates Royal Order by which is declared National Monument the section of the wall covered between the puerta de la Macarena and de Córdoba". Despite this official statement, in 1909 the city council continued to maintain its idea of ensanche and new urbanity of the neighborhood, so it made the following determination about its demolition:

If the remains of the Roman walls that in lamentable state of ruin extending from the puerta de la Macarena towards Capuchinos had any archaeological value or recall a glorious fact of our history, it would not be the councilman who dared to propose its demolition, even recognizing the great benefits that it could bring entire Seville and especially the neighborhood in which these are embedded; but these remains of the walls have no other merit than that given its age, and this is not enough reason for that it be sacrificed conveniences of very high order.

The arch is strongly linked to the image of Holy Mary of la Esperanza Macarena and their confraternity through it annually at beginning and end its penitential station in dawn of Good Friday. On the occasion of this relationship was installed in the attic of the gate in 1922 a ceramic azulejo polychrome altarpiece representing to this image by the Alcalareñan painter Manuel Rodríguez y Pérez de Tudela. For its construction, the Confraternity of la Macarena held a popular collection, and was inaugurated on May 27 of 1923 by the infanta Maria de la Esperanza of Bourbon-Two Sicilies.

During the riots of the coup of 1936, the arch suffered two gunshots, and its wall served as a firing squad, where were shot many people after the coup.

Leaving aside the declaration of a national monument dictated in 1908 by the Ministry of Fine Arts, the remains of gates and city walls were declared in 1985 and Bien de Interés Cultural, under the category of monument. Ten years later took place the most significant step of the Confraternity of la Macarena through the gate, which occurred during the celebration of the 4th centenary of the foundation of confraternity; after a solemn pontifical officiated the September 23 by the Archbishop of Seville friar Carlos Amigo Vallejo, and attended the Infanta Maria de la Esperanza of Bourbon-Two Sicilies (who had opened 72 years before the azulejo ceramic altarpiece), along with her husband, the pretender prince of Brazil Don Pedro Gastão of Orléans-Braganza, the Marian image held a procession extraordinary through the streets of the city, through the gate to its exit and entrance of the temple.

The last reform in the gate took place in 1998 when was executed an archaeological intervention, in order to consolidate the bow of the arch, which was in poor condition.

Today is popularly referred to as arch and not as gate, and represents a symbol for its neighborhood. Its association with the Confraternity of la Macarena, which Marian image of the Our Lady of la Esperanza Macarena, of universal devotion, have also contributed to popularizing the arch, in which crowd hundreds of faithful during the early hours of Maundy Thursday and the morning of Good Friday to see the image cross under the arch in the celebrations of the Holy Week in Seville On January 21, 2012, the Sociedad Estatal de Correos y Telégrafos issued a series concerning to arches and monumental gates, choosing among them the puerta de la Macarena.

== See also ==
- Walls of Seville
