= Postigo =

Postigo may refer to

- Postigo (surname)
- Postigo del Aceite, a gate in Sevilla, Spain
- Leon B. Postigo, Zamboanga del Norte, a municipality in the Philippines
