= Postigo del Aceite =

Gate in Sevilla, Spain

Coordinates: 37.3852°N 5.9950°W

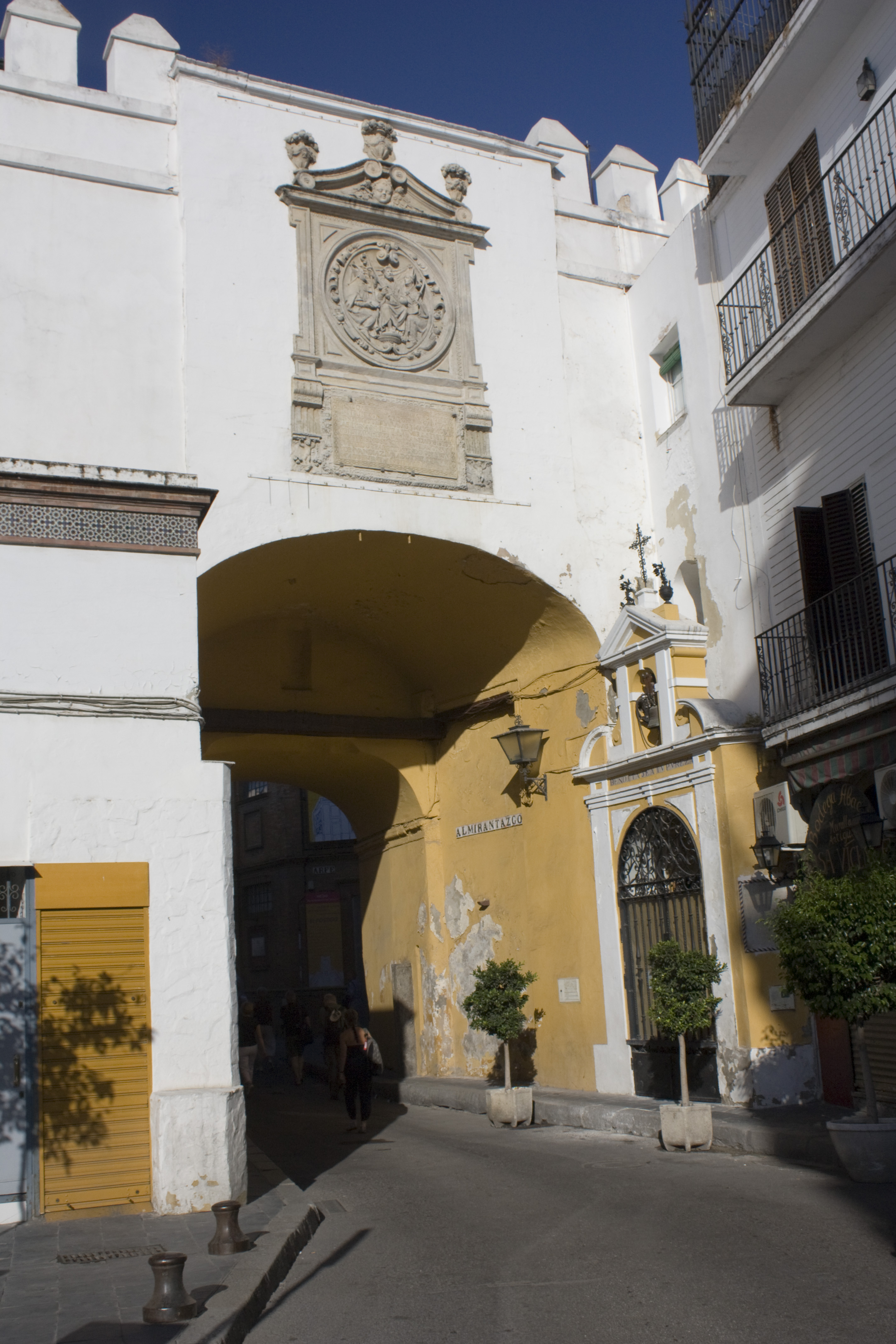
Image of Postigo del Aceite today.

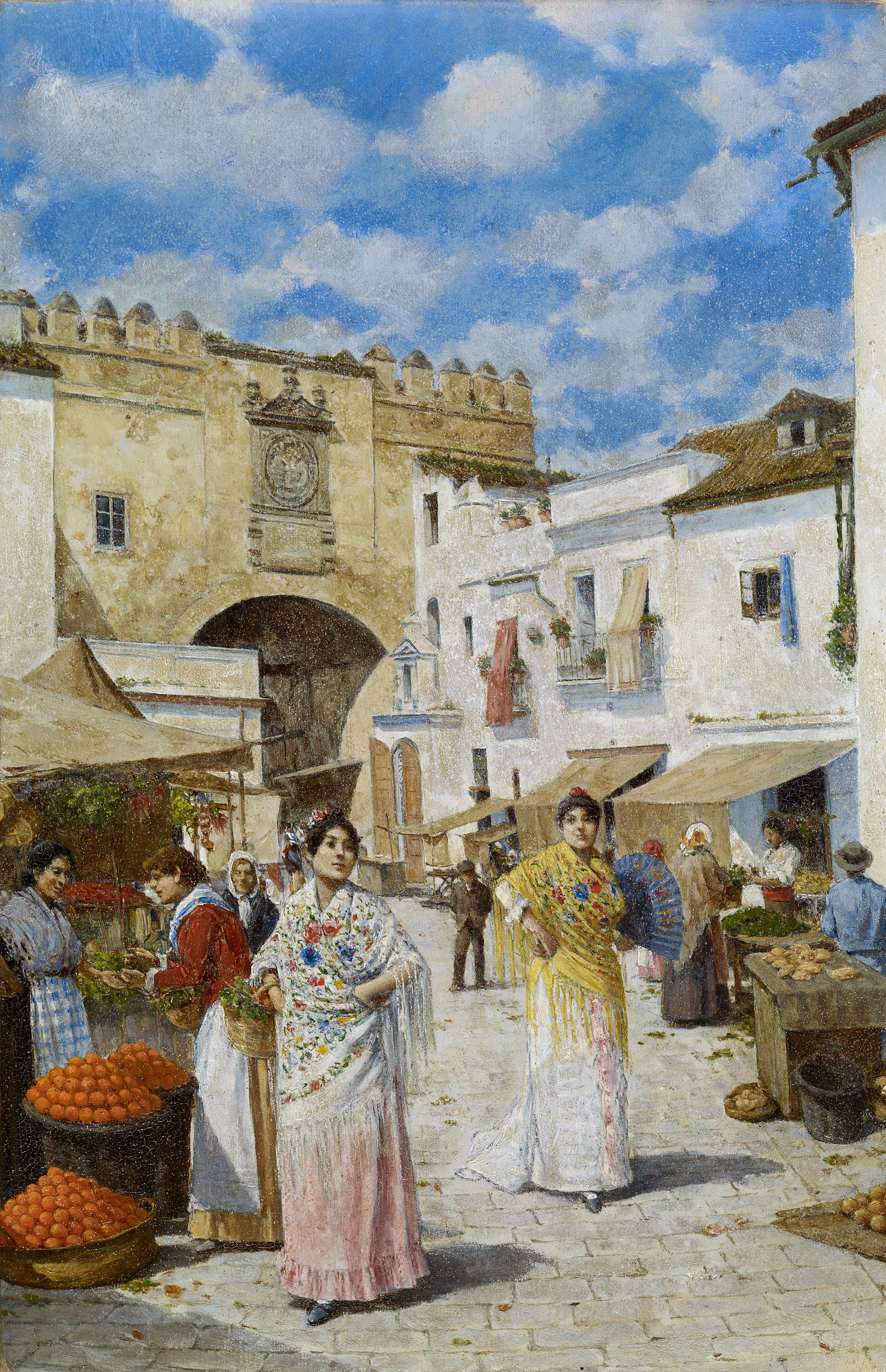
Market next to the postigo in a work by Joaquín Turina in 1907 (Thyssen Museum of Málaga)

The Oil Postern (Postigo del Aceite, known in Muslim times as bad al-Qatay) is, together with the Macarena Gate and Puerta de Córdoba, one of the three preserved gates today of the walls of Seville, Andalusia, Spain.

Located in the old area of Puerto de Indias, next to the Correos building in the barrio del Arenal of Seville, including the calle Dos de Mayo and the calle Almirantazgo, bordering the Royal Dockyards of Seville.

== History and description ==
It was built in the year 1107, in times of Ali ibn Yusuf, and renovated in 1572 - 1573 by architect Benvenuto Tortello under the mandate of Francisco Zapata y Cisneros, 1st Count of Barajas, who then held the position of mayor. It was well known as it was the place where entered the oil to the city. In the 18th century was opened on its right side a small chapel which had a baroque altarpiece with an image of the Immaculate Conception attributed to Pedro Roldán.

In the 12th century had a different function, and was known as bad al-Qatay ( gate of Boats) as the Almohad rose next to the Royal Dockyards of Seville for the construction of ships; later it recorded in some sources as puerta de la Alhóndiga (gate of the Granary), puerta del Aceite (gate of the Oil) or puerta de la Aceituna (gate of the Olive), according to tradition because through that gate come these products in the city.

On the inside of the postigo, on the arch, it features a carved stone representation of Saint Ferdinand, with the bishops Isidore and Leander and, under it, a tombstone that attests the reform by Tortello. Inside the arch it can see the rails where were placed the planks to stop the constant flooding of the river.

The entrances of the walls were divided into puertas and postigos, defined as postigos the non-main gates of the city or town. This place is also known in Seville as arco del Postigo.

Much of the walls was demolished by the City Council of Seville in the 19th century on the occasion of the new urbanization and ensanche of the city. Currently only they remain completes the puerta de la Macarena and this postigo, and preserved little remains of what were the puerta Real, the puerta de Córdoba and postigo del Carbón.

For the architectural environment and narrowness, it is viewed by some as one of the favorite points of the confraternities to see pass the Confraternities of the Holy Week in Seville.

== Costalero of the Postigo ==
The Holy Monday of year 1999 is sadly remembered for having happened in the arch the death of the Costalero Juan Carlos Montes happened to the shout of Al cielo con Él (To the heaven with he)

== See also ==
Walls of Seville
