= Royal Shipyards of Seville =

13th-15th century Spanish shipyard

Coordinates: 37°23′05″N 5°59′44″W

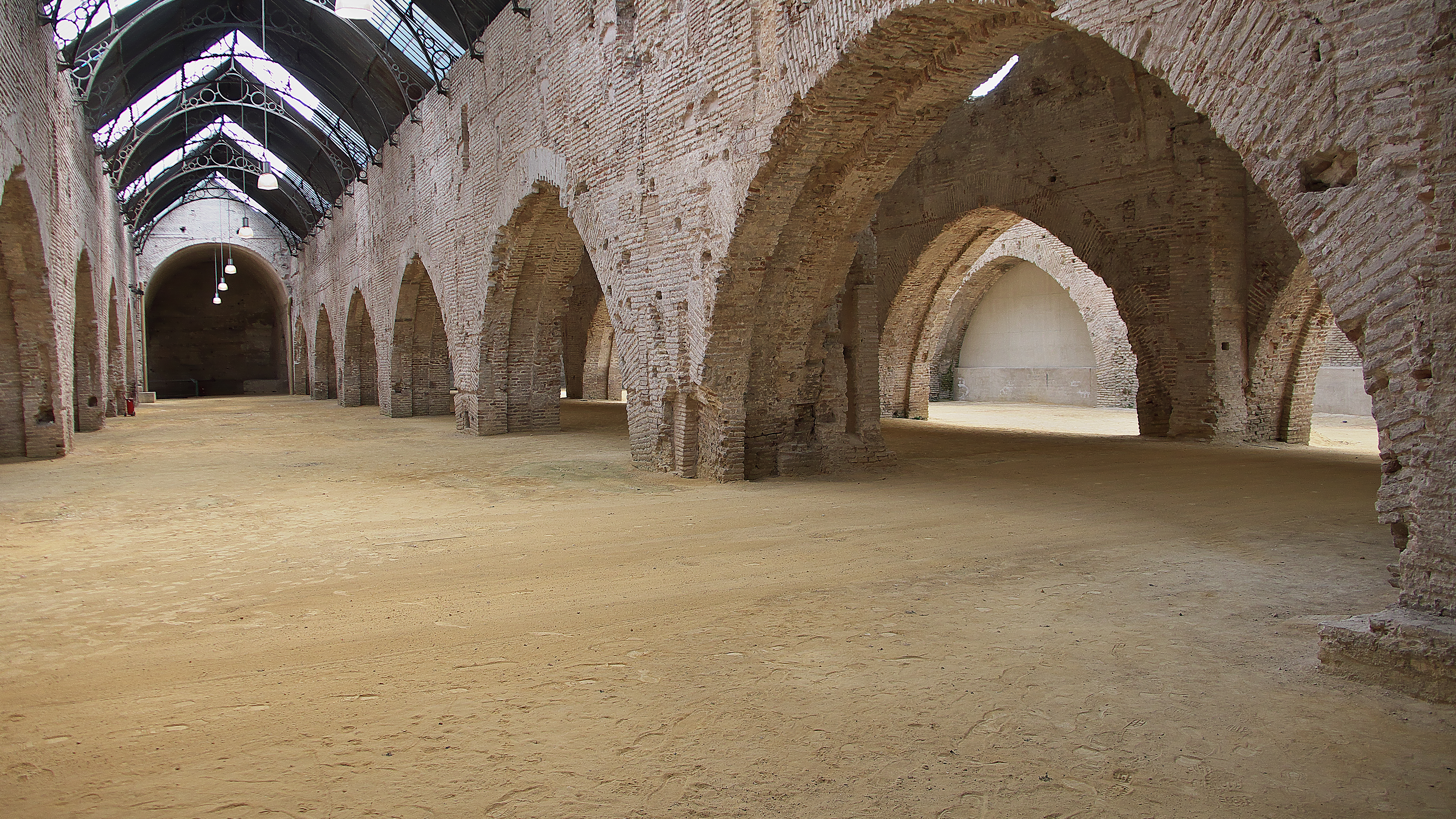
Seven naves of the Seville Shipyards remain standing.

The Seville Shipyard (Spanish: Atarazanas de Sevilla) is a medieval shipyard in the city of Seville (Andalusia, Spain) that operated from the 13th to the 15th century. Composed of seventeen naves, the building was connected to the Guadalquivir River by a stretch of sand.

On March 13, 1969, the State gave Monumento Histórico Artístico status to the Shipyards, and on June 18, 1985, the Maestranza de Artillería de Sevilla (which includes the seven naves and other structures, such as a front pavilion) was added to the Bien de Interés Cultural category of monuments.

== Background ==
The first record of shipyards in the city dates back to the Roman era, during the 1st century BC, when the civil war between Pompey and Julius Caesar took place:

[Marcus Terentius Varro] practiced a recruitment throughout the Province [of Hispania Ulterior] and his two full legions added thirty auxiliary cohorts. He stored a large quantity of wheat, which he had to send to the people of Marseille, and partly also to Afranius and Petreia. He ordered Cádizans to build ten ships of line and, in addition, he tried to build enough in Hispalis [Seville]

— Julius Caesar. De Bellum civile. 49 a.C.

Several centuries later, during the 9th century, a series of Viking attacks occurred on the peninsular coasts, including in Seville. This attack motivated Caliph Abd ar-Rahman II to reinforce the wall of Isbylia (Seville, as it had been called then) and to create a permanent war fleet. To this end, he ordered the construction of shipyards in Seville:

[...] that a shipyard be built in Seville, and that ships be built; the factory was prepared reculting seamen from the Spanish coasts, who gave good soil and provided instruments or machines to throw burning bitumen.

— Ibn al-Qūṭiyya, Chronicle of the conquest of Al Andalus.

About 200 years later, in 1184, the caliph Abu Yusuf Yaqub al-Mansur ordered the governor of the city, Abu Dawud Yalul ben Yildasan, to manufacture a large fleet and build shipyards to deal with the Christian kingdoms.

It is unknown where these former shipyards were located. According to archaeologists, the Castilian shipyards that are still in use today were not built on top of any previous ones.

== Original design ==
Ferdinand III of Castile conquered Seville, replacing Muslim rule in 1248. After making conquests over most of the peninsula, he decided to undertake military campaigns to occupy northern Africa as well. He decided to build several ships and galleys in Seville. He died in 1252, but his son, Alfonso X of Castile "the Wise", agreed with the usefulness of creating a fleet and ordered the construction of the shipyards to continue.

The site chosen was outside the walled enclosure and close to the Guadalquivir River, in the area between Torre del Oro, Torre de la Plata, the Postigo del Carbón gate, and the Postigo del Aceite gate. In the neighborhood of El Arenal, 17 naves made from brick were erected perpendicular to the Guadalquivir and in front of the Almohad walls of the city, covering about 15,000 square meters.

This stretch of land also included the Resolana del Río, a large expanse of sand that reached the Guadalquivir. The project was one of the largest industrial installations of the European Late Middle Ages, comparable to the Venetian Arsenal.

Architecturally, the shipyard is a Gothic work. Mudéjar (Muslims still living on the peninsula after the Reconquista) built the entire structure in a brick factory, and their work shows the influence of Almohad art in medieval constructions in Seville. Its wide and long naves were attached to (and covered by) massive vaults, appropriate for the construction of the largest ships of that era. These naves communicate laterally through thick arches that are slightly pointed and facing each other, built from ground-level.

== Operation ==
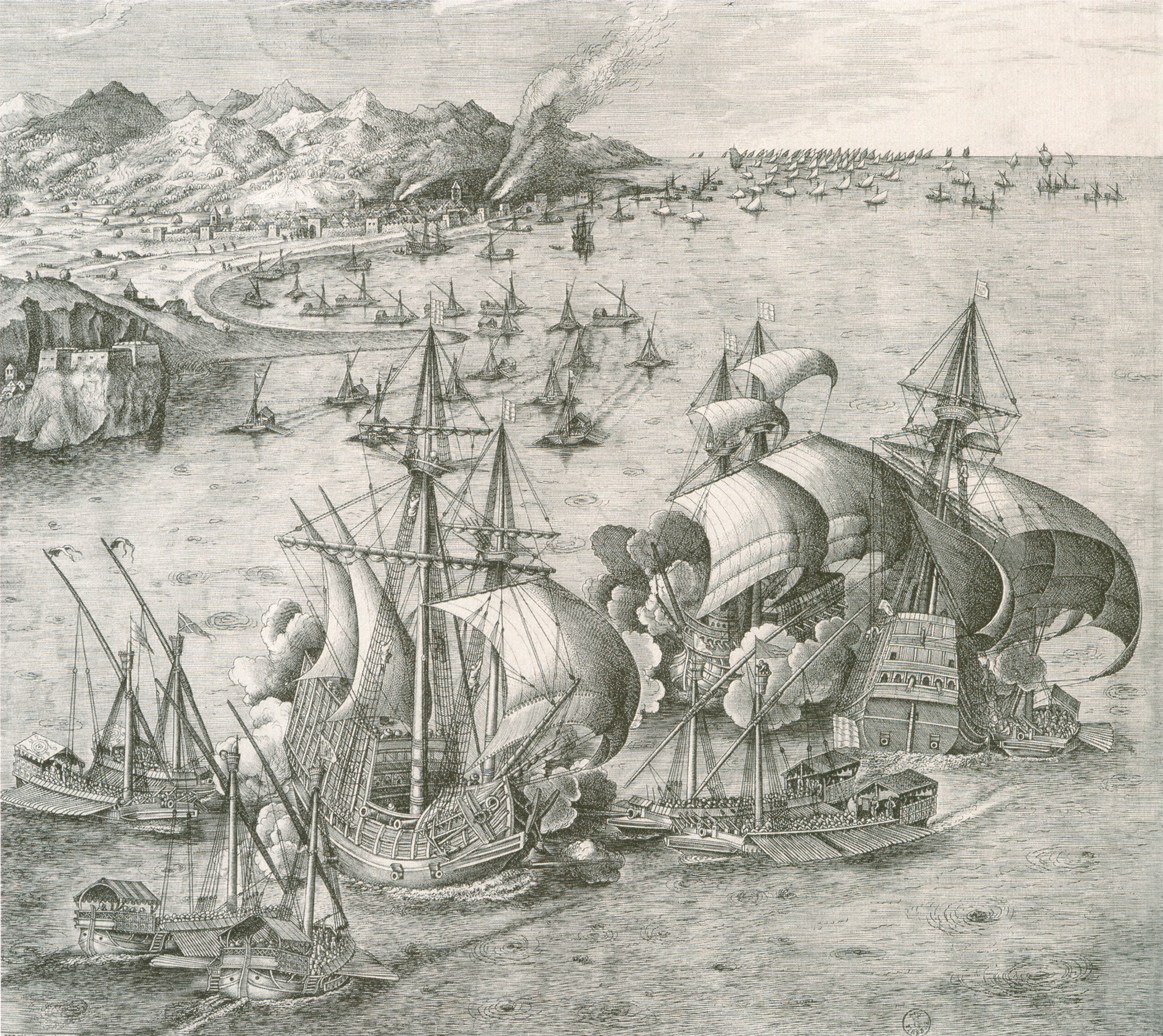
Naval combat between galleys and carracks towards 1561.

In 1253, there were already ten galleys built. King Alfonso appointed ten captains or commissars, some of them French and Italians who had come to collaborate in the Reconquista. The commissars and their heirs had to take care of and repair their own galleys, always use the ships in the name of the king, and under deference to the Major Admiral of Castile (a position created by Alfonso in 1254). In 1407, reigning monarch John II of Castile, noted that there were 70 commissars in Seville. The Major Admiral of Castile also had speaking and voting powers on the municipal council.

The Spanish monarchy used the shipyards for various other functions in their first centuries of operation. Because of their sheer size, they served to host assemblies and public celebrations. They were also a natural place to store loot and prisoners captured by the fleets of the Castilian kings. Sometimes they served as jails for the social elite, for example, nobles related to King Peter of Castile were imprisoned there after he was usurped by King Henry II of Castile.

The shipyards frequently built fleets of twenty galleys and, on special occasions, up to thirty. The Castilian kings used them during struggles for control of the Strait of Gibraltar against the Muslims, and in raids against England during the Hundred Years' War. For a fleet's construction and armament, a labor force of between 400 and 500 artisans was temporarily mobilized, who, in exchange for working for the Crown for half the usual salary, enjoyed great fiscal privileges throughout the year. For this reason they were called "francs." The Crown also possessed an indeterminate number of slaves, mainly Muslim prisoners, who were ordered to perform the most painful tasks. The wood for the construction of the ships was brought from Crown-owned forests located in the Sierra Norte de Sevilla.

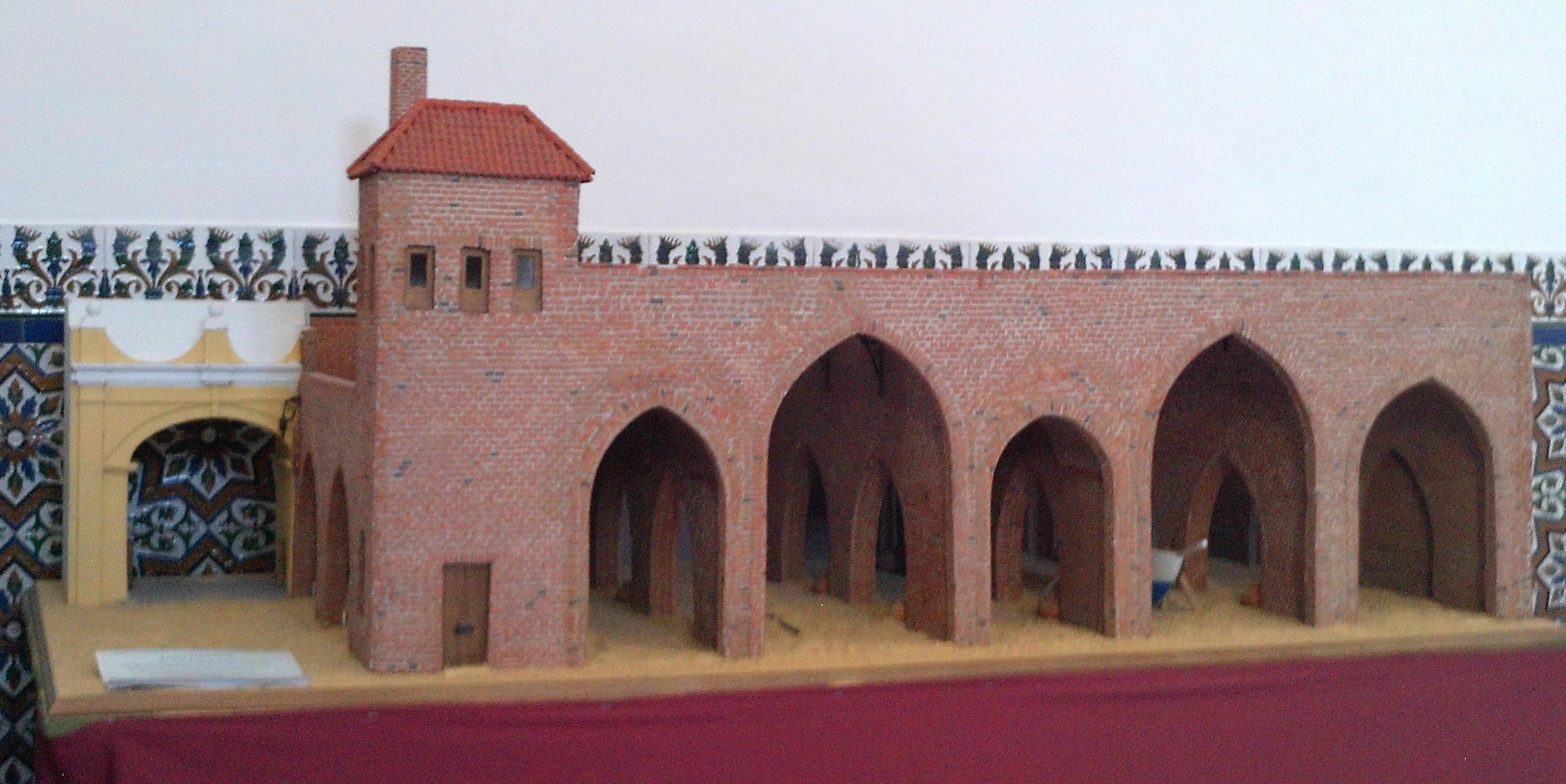
Model of the Seville Shipyard

The naves could hold a large number of galleys and vessels, as well as all the equipment for assembly, repair and maintenance. Spoils of war were also kept there. Caulkers, carpenters, blacksmiths and other artisans worked at the shipyard as well. Those who worked there were under the authority of the alcaide of the Alcázar of Seville (the palace-fortress nearby) and the shipyards. This warden was appointed by the king. The position of warden used to fall to a nobleman who, at times, delegated the exercise of his work to a trusted agent instead of completing it himself.

In the early 15th century, the shipyards built their final large fleets of galleys. Fifteen ships were sent to an incursion against England in 1420, and an indeterminate number to the war against Aragon in 1430. After these battles, the Castilian kings ceased to regularly order galleys. By 1450, the hulls of some twenty galleys, built but not armed, were rotting in their facilities.

During the last stages of the Reconquista, the Catholic Monarchs installed the seat of their court in Seville. At the end of the 15th century, some repair jobs of the shipyards were carried out by their orders. Later, in 1493, the Catholic Monarchs approved to have a fish market move from the Plaza de San Francisco square to the first nave (the one closest to the Postigo del Aceite gate). In that nave, several fish markets and some houses were built.

On February 14, 1503, at the signing of the constitution of the Casa de Contratación de Indias, the southernmost nave was destined as the Casa's headquarters. However, on June 5, the headquarters of the Casa would be moved to the Alcázar. In 1587, the city's customs house was located on naves 13, 14 and 15, south of the building. Throughout the 16th century, one nave was rented out as an oil warehouse and another as a wool warehouse. The warden was meant to surveil the site and collect all of the rent. Another nave was turned into a mercury storehouse. Mercury was transported there in lamb-skin bags from Almadén mines, and then used to help extract silver in the American mines.

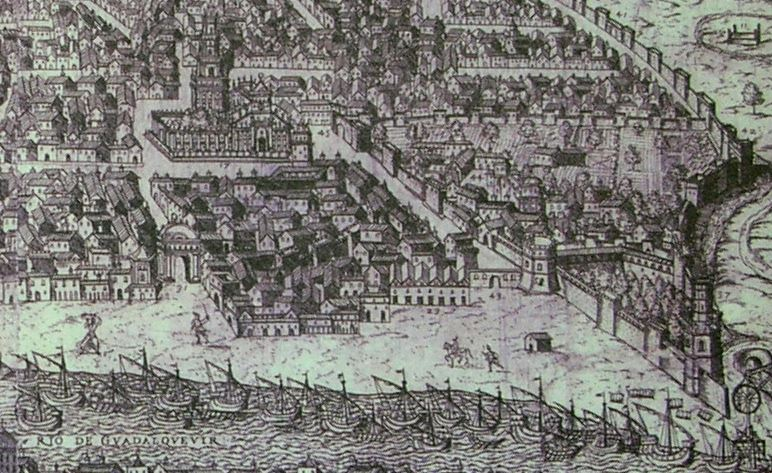
In this view of Seville at the end of the 16th century, "The Shipyards" is indicated with nº 23, next to "Postigo del Carbón" gate (nº 43).

There were other reasons why the shipyards stopped producing galleys, other than the need for warehouse space. After the end of the wars with England and the battles for the Strait of Gibraltar, the Kingdom of Castile stopped needing warships. The architectural design of the shipyards was also only optimized for building galleys, which had lost combat capacity against novel designs, such as the carrack and the nao, which were faster, stronger, and had improved range thanks to their smaller crews. For the Crown, it was also more economically advantageous to rent out private sailing vessels than to build and maintain permanent fleets of galleys. Finally, the ascent to the throne in 1475 of Isabella I and her husband Ferdinand II of Aragon (called the Catholic Monarchs years later) meant that Castilians gained access to shipyards of the Crown of Aragon, which may have been cheaper to use than the one in Seville.

Although the workload decreased, the number of artisans officially linked to the shipyard did not fall, provoking frequent protests by the Council of Seville about the injustice represented by the tax exemptions of the francs and other protected occupations. Until 1549, the fourth nave of the shipyards was designated for the manufacture of pumps to reduce water in the boats, and became known as "the fireman's nave."

In 1570, a large galley would be built in Barcelona and taken to Seville to be decorated with Renaissance allegorical motifs. This was the Capitana galley, commanded by John of Austria during the Battle of Lepanto.

On June 5, 1593, King Philip II of Spain would prohibit by Royal Decree that the ships built in the Sevillian Shipyards be used for trips to the Indies, claiming that their wood was greatly inferior compared to that used by shipyards in northern Spain.

Little by little, the shipyards gradually transformed into a series of commercial warehouses. Sugar, ginger, cinnamon, medicinal plants and noble woods from the Indies were also stored there. In the 18th century, the premises were labeled with a sign that read: "La Real Casa de Atarazanas de Azogues de Indias" (The Royal House of Shipyards of Markets of Indies).

== Transformations and destruction ==
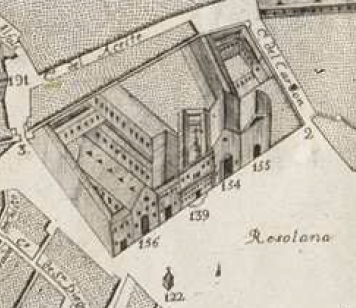
The Shipyards in the Plan of Olavide of 1771. They indicate, from left to right, the Real Maestranza de Artillería de Sevilla (156), the Hospital de la Caridad (139), the Customs (154) and a wool warehouse (155).

Throughout their history, the Royal Shipyards have undergone important transformations. At present, only seven of the seventeen original naves remain standing.

The first major architectural intervention took place in the year 1641, with the construction of Hospital de la Caridad and its church, occupying five of the naves, whose arches can still be glimpsed today.

In 1719, the government ordered that five naves be used to store artillery material, a function that had been carried out by the shipyards since 1587 CE. In 1762, a major reform of the Artillery Corps began. Over the years, the Real Maestranza de Artillería de Sevilla moved a large warehouse of carriages and accoutrements to the shipyards, further expanding the capacity of the workshops, and annexing two more naves (for a total of seven) that the Army would occupy until the 20th century. In 1782 CE, the Maestranzas of Cádiz and Málaga merged into the one in Seville, leaving it as the sole supplier for all of Andalusia and Extremadura and, one year later, also for the Indias. The merger led to a new architectural operation that transformed part of the building and raised the current façade.

Apart from the construction of Hospital de la Caridad in the 17th century, the rest of the structure of the original building survived completely until 1945, when five of the buildings were demolished to make room for the construction of the current building of the Treasury Delegation.

The Shipyards of Seville have been declared Bien de Interés Cultural and cataloged as Monumento Nacional since 1969. In 1993 they became property of the Junta de Andalucía. In 2009, the Board assigned the building to the La Caixa financial entity for a period of 75 years in order to build a cultural dissemination center called CaixaForum Sevilla. At the end of 2012, La Caixa announced that it would build the Caixaforum in another part of the city, which sparked a conflict with the Junta de Andalucía. The debate concluded with an agreement whereby the financial institution would invest 10 million euros in another cultural project other than the shipyards.

== Movie scenario ==
The Shipyards of Seville were used as the setting for the series Game of Thrones to recreate the crypts of the Red Fortress. The filming took place in November 2016 for the seventh season.
