= Puerta de San Fernando =

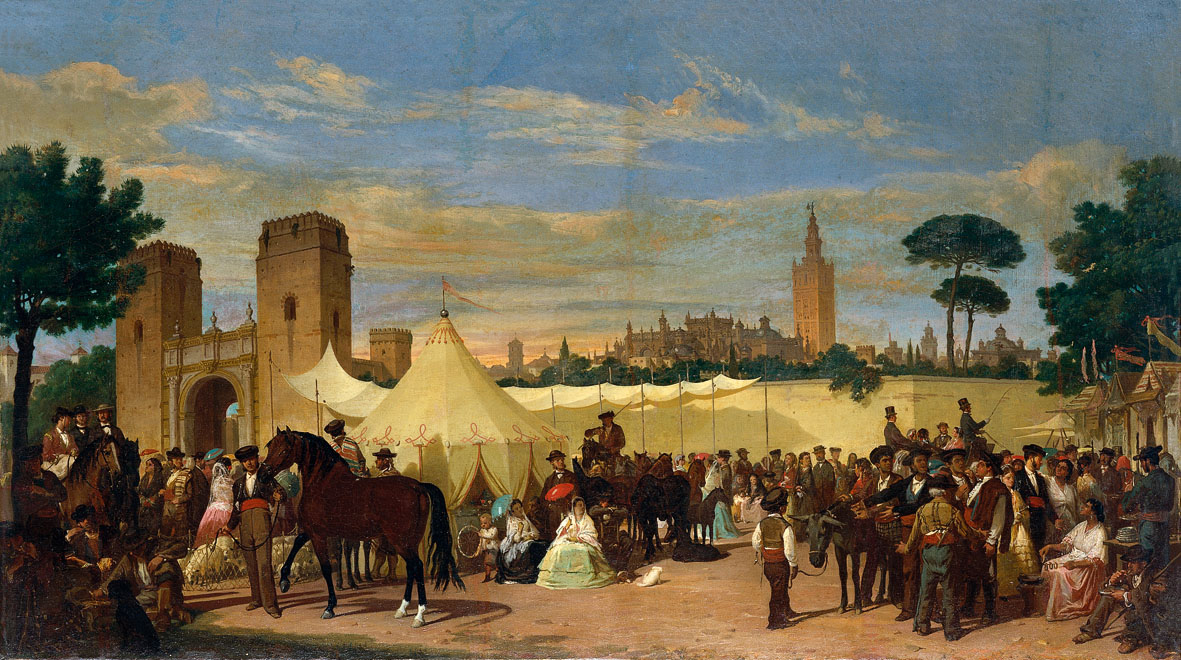
The Seville Fair by Joaquín Domínguez Bécquer showing this gate in the foreground. c. 1867. Museo Carmen Thyssen Málaga.

The Puerta de San Fernando was a gate of the walled enclosure of Seville, Spain.

It was located at the beginning of the straight and spacious street of the same name, at the level of the former Royal Tobacco Factory, now the University of Seville. Also known as Puerta Nueva, it is no surprise that it was constructed in the mid-18th century, specifically in 1760.

== Description ==
The gate's monumentality drew attention, flanked by two crenellated towers that had served as faithful sentries in its past defensive role.

This gate had its two fronts unequal in architecture, as belonging Doric to the outside and Ionic on the inside. In each of those appeared four columns on pedestals, two on each side of the arch, which had of light 4'18 m. and 7.52 m. in front of the high and solid lateral towers.

== Demolition ==
The gate existed for only a century. On September 9, 1864, the City Hall decided to demolish it. However, difficulties arose when the Administrator of the Royal Heritage defended the monument's ownership, claiming it belonged to the Royal House. This intervention spared the gate from the same fate as other Sevillan gates, which were destroyed despite being auctioned off. The gate, along with those of Osario and Carmona, was eventually reduced to rubble in 1868.

== See also ==
- Walls of Seville
