= Postigo (surname) =

Postigo is a Spanish surname. Notable people with the surname include:

- Juan García Postigo (born 1982), Spanish beauty pageant contestant
- Luis García Postigo (born 1969), Mexican football player
- Serge Postigo (born 1968), Canadian actor
- Sergio Postigo (born 1988), Spanish football player
