= Puerta de Triana =

Demolished gate in Seville

The Puerta de Triana was the generic name for an Almohad gate which was later on replaced by a Christian gate at the same place. It was one of the gates of the walled enclosure of Seville (Andalusia).

On the site previously stood a gate dating from the Almohad period that was demolished to build the Puerta de Triana in 1588. It was located at the junction of the calles Gravina, Reyes Católicos and Zaragoza. It was the only gate in the walled city of Seville who had three arches, so it was called "Puerta de Trina." The appellation quickly evolved to Triana, and the neighborhood behind this gate was connected to the rest of the city through the puente de Barcas, a gate commissioned by the Caliph Abu Yaqub Yusuf. Outside of Triana when it would expect it to be in the Plaza de Altozano. This gate was well known for its confluence with the calles Santas Patronas and is considered one of the most majestic gates to have existed in Seville for its elegance and height.

== Description ==
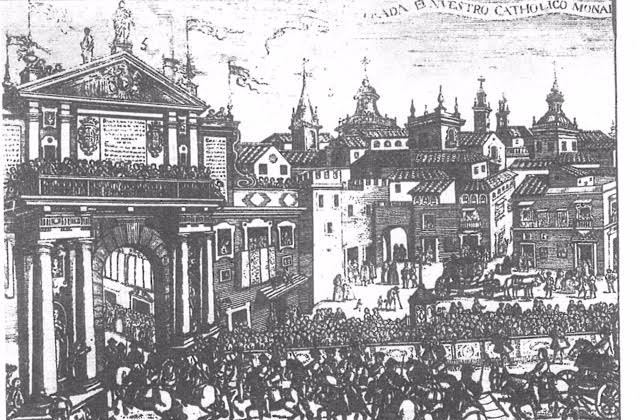
Puerta de Triana during the triumphal entrance of a monarch.

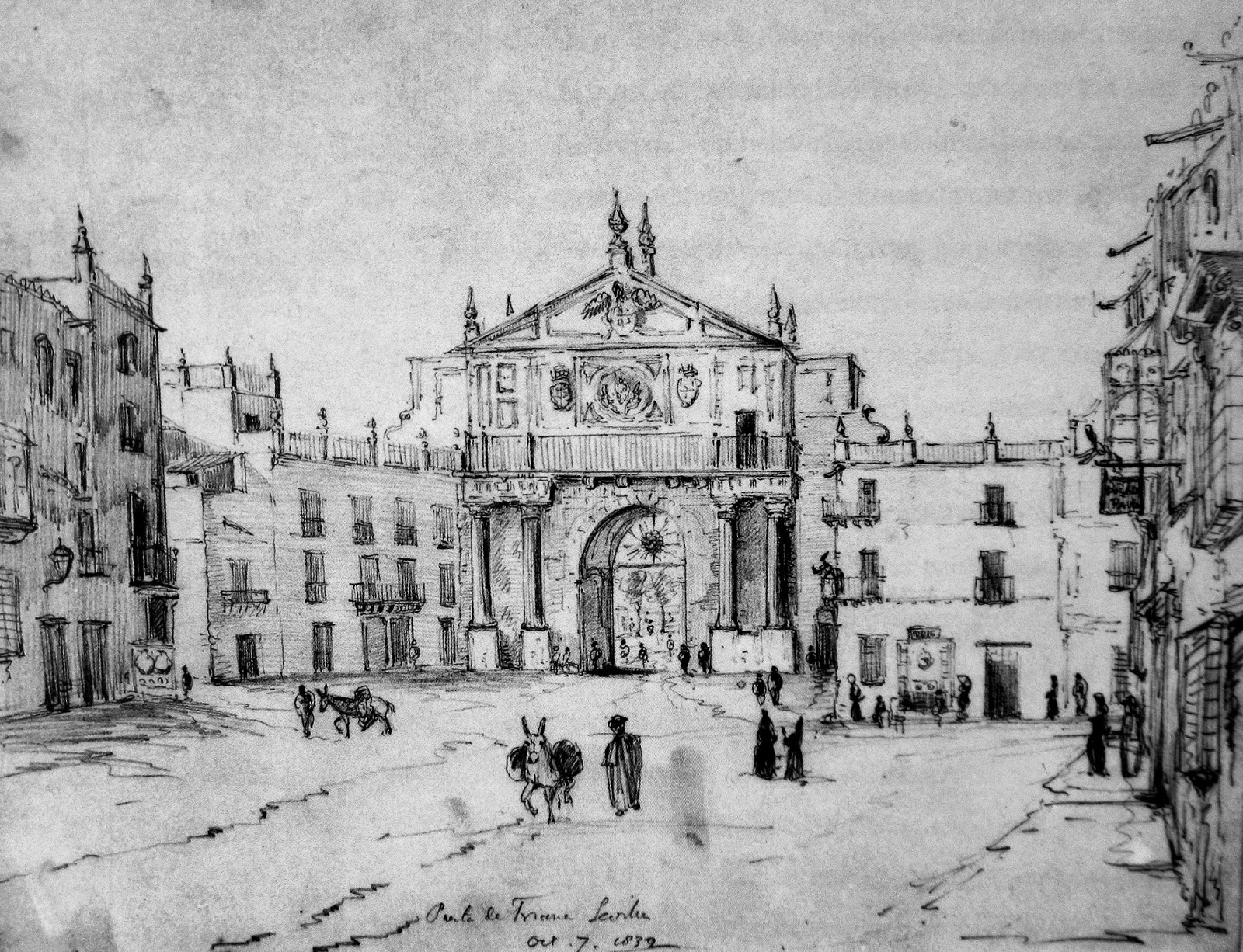
Drawing of the Puerta de Triana painted by Richard Ford.

The style of this gate was Doric and although its construction was not thoroughly documented, some scholars argue that it was designed by the architect Juan de Herrera; the same designer behind the building of the Casa Lonja which houses the General Archive of the Indies today.

It is a singular structure with two tall and elegant facades, and this led to it being regarded as the most artistic city gate in Seville. At its center was a large semicircular arch while the two sides boasted a pair of columns each with fluted shafts which held a large cornice on which stood a balcony. The top of the monument was adorned with statues and six small pyramids. At the bottom of the ledge belonging to the balcony was a stele bearing this inscription:

Being very powerful king of the Spains and of our provinces on the part of the world Philip II, the vast regiment of Seville judged duty, be adorned this new puerta de Triana, place in new site, promoting the work and attending its imperfection Don Juan Hurtado de Mendoza y Guzmán, Count of Orgaz, vigilant top of it flourishing city in the year of the Christian health 1588.

In the gap or intermediate space between the two facades there is a large lounge called "El Castillo", which was used as a prison for prisoners belonging to the nobility; the same use that had the Torre del Oro in the late Middle Ages.

== Destruction ==
The why of the demolition of this gate was the construction of the Station of Córdoba, the works of the bridge Puente de Isabel II and in El Arenal, which almost led to order its demolition. The city grew and this, instead of jumping on the battlements of the walls, decided to tear it down. The journey of Queen Isabel II to Seville in 1868 was the trigger that prompted definitively the demolition of the gate, at the height of the revolutionary government.

This gate, one of the last to collapse, was the one that was closer to salvation. No doubt it turned efforts the intellectuals of the city, but the First Republic, hungry for revenge, wanted to erase all signs of monarchy in the city of Seville, and this gate was definitely part of that symbol. On September 21, 1868, after several pardons, its sentence for demolition was signed, and in less than 40 days was demolished.

== Remains ==
Curiously, in the current steely changes of color in what was the plant of the gate and the width of the street it was who had the arch.

Its remains were divided into two destinations, some of them served as a foundation for building of the 24th house on the calle San Eloy, house belonging to the contractor who carried out the demolition; the other remain was sold to "Aguas de Jerez", which also sold much of the fountains and cobblestone dismantled the city in that decade. In turn, some of these remains it used the same Jerezian company to create the deposit of the Zoo of Jerez de la Frontera and in fact, today part of these stones are exposed in this zoo as a trophy.

== See also ==
- Walls of Seville

== Bibliography ==
- PASSOLA JÁUREGUI, Jaime. "Apuntes para conocer Sevilla". Seville: Publisher Jirones de azul, 2006.
- AGUILAR PIÑAR, Francisco. De Híspalis a Sevilla. Nuevas aportaciones históricas.Seville: Publisher: Ediciones Alfar, 2008.
- AMADOR DE LOS RÍOS, José. Sevilla pintoresca o descripción de sus más célebres monumentos artísticos. Barcelona: Publisher: Ediciones El Albir, S.A., 1979.
