= Walls of Seville =

Defensive fortification in Seville, Spain

- Murallas de Sevilla (Spanish)
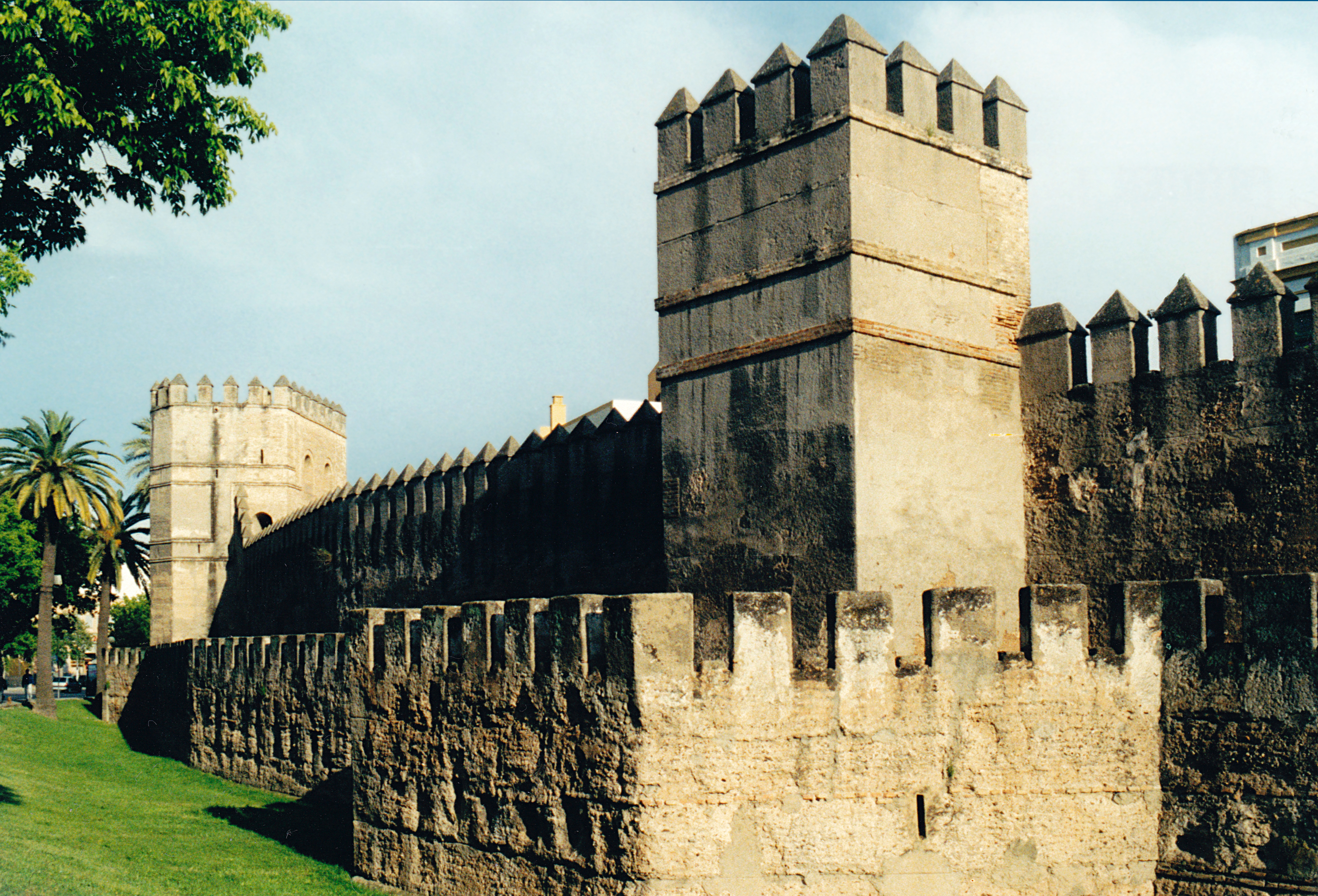

- Location within Spain
- 37.401976°N 5.986553°W
- Location: Sevilla, Spain

Spanish Cultural Heritage
- Official name: Murallas de Sevilla
- Type: Non-movable
- Criteria: Monument
- Designated: 1908
- Reference no.: RI-51-0000093

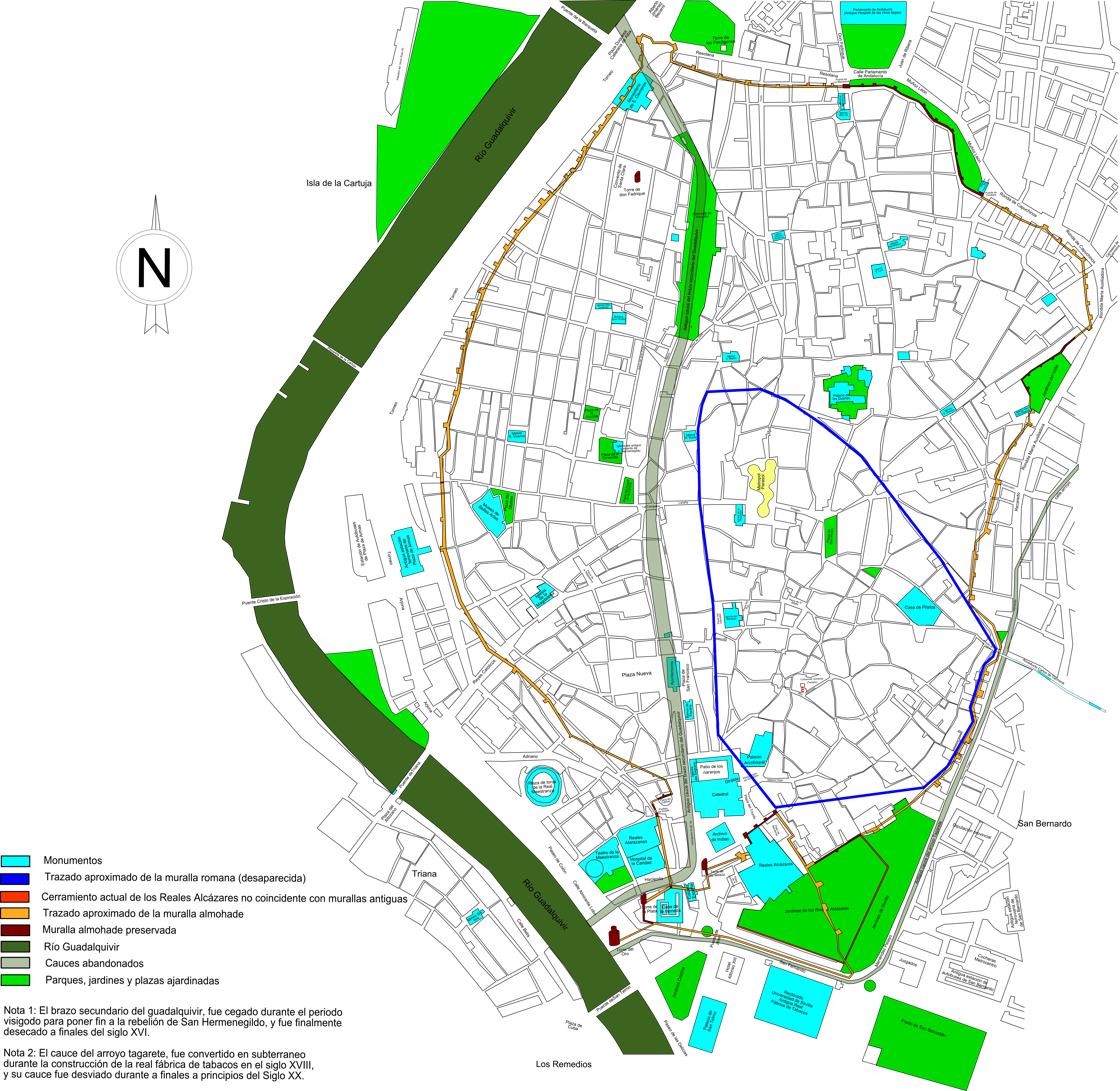
Plan of the course that followed the Walls of Sevilla in the 17th century, drawn on the current street of the old town, where it included the layout of the primitive Roman walls as well as preserved sections and other data of interest.

The Walls of Seville (Spanish: Murallas de Sevilla) are a series of defensive walls surrounding the Old Town of Seville. The city has been surrounded by walls since the Roman period, and they were maintained and modified throughout the subsequent Visigoth, Islamic and finally Castilian periods. The walls remained intact until the 19th century, when they were partially demolished after the revolution of 1868. Some parts of the walls still exist, especially around the Alcázar of Seville and some curtain walls in the barrio de la Macarena.

The walls originally had eighteen gates or points of access, four of which survive today: Macarena Gate, Puerta de Córdoba, Postigo del Aceite and Postigo del Alcázar. The extant parts of the walls maintain an Almohad appearance, mixed with Classicist air resulting from restorations carried out in the 18th century.

== History ==
=== Construction during the Roman Empire ===
The defensive walls were built in times of Julius Caesar, approximately between the years 68 and 65 BC, when he was quaestor of the city. This new fortification was aimed at replacing the old Carthaginian stockade of logs and mud. The walls were expanded and refined during the rule of his adopted son Augustus due to the growth of the city; these were protected by cyclopean towers.

The remains of the materials this stage are only recognizable in the material reused in Caliphate period in the new Walls of the Alcázar of Seville.

In late 2021, for the first time, the remains of a section of the Roman wall of Seville were discovered. Today, these remnants are part of the dividing wall of a building facing Álvarez Quintero Street and another overlooking Plaza de San Francisco. The wall segment is 4.8 meters wide and has two different heights, dating back to around the 3rd century AD.

=== Expansion in the Islamic period: 9th-12th centuries ===
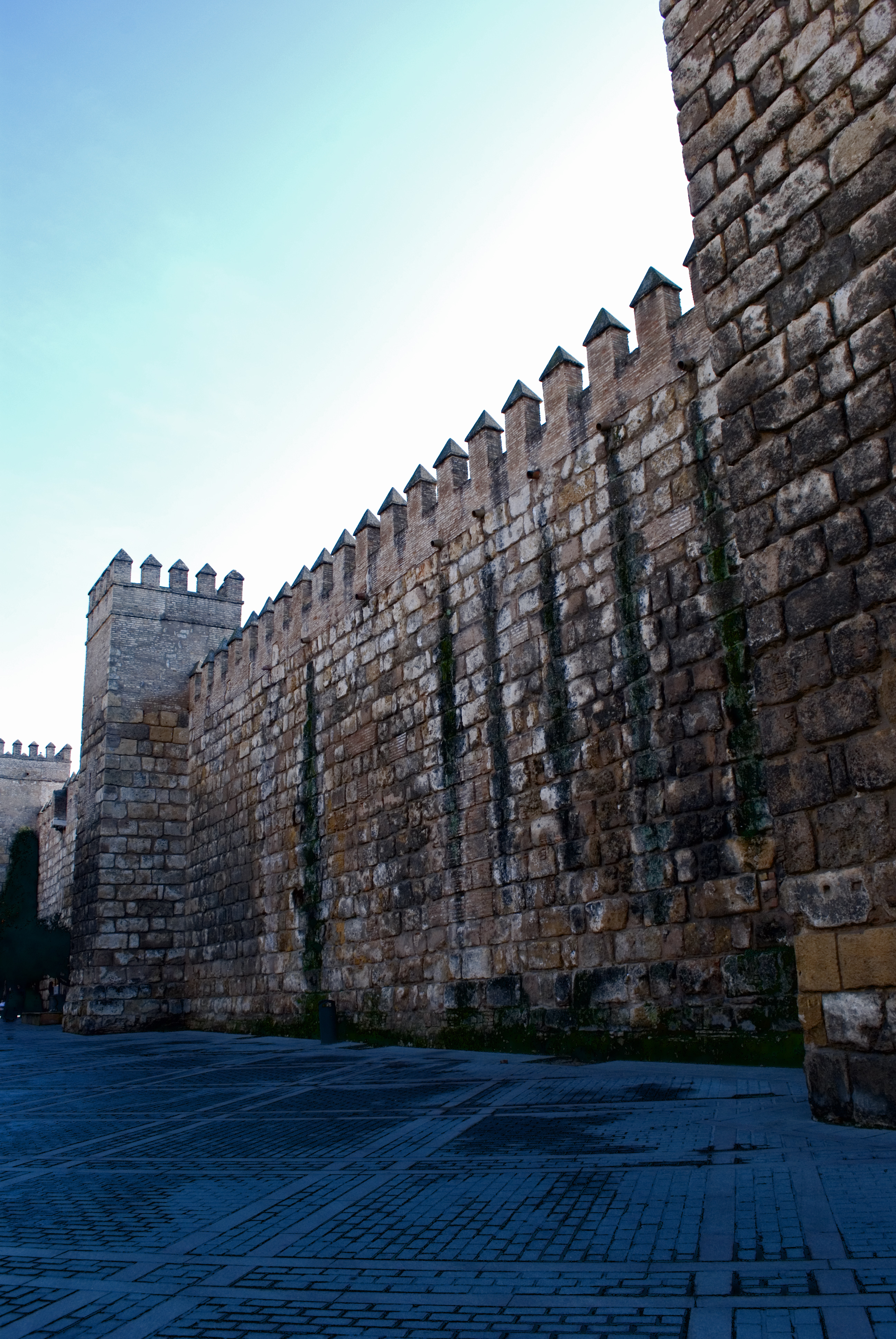
Curtain wall in the Alcazar of Seville

During the Islamic rule, particularly in the year 844, the city was razed by the Vikings, and the walls were burned down. After that the emir Abderramán II, fourth Umayyad Emir of Córdoba (822–852) rebuilt the walls, which were again destroyed by his great grandson Abd-ar-Rahman III, eighth independent emir (912–929) and first Umayyad caliph of Córdoba (929–961).

In 1023, Abu al-Qasim first King Taifa of Seville (1023–1042), ordered the walls to be raised again to protect the city from Christian troops, and between the 11th century and 12th century a major expansion that doubled the walled enclosure took place. The defense of the city was extended, widened and strengthened, expanding the space protected by the walls in almost twice its old surface. His successors, aware of the progress achieved over the northern Christian kingdoms in the stage of the reconquista, devoted themselves to strengthening their defenses, resulting in the final enclosure of the walls.

The gates of al-Andalusian cities were not built with the road axis but were angled to make it as difficult as possible the siege. Thus, the attackers had to cross several gates and courtyards before entering the city. From the heights defenders fired arrows and poured boiling oil on the attackers.

=== The Walls after the reconquista: 13th-16th centuries ===
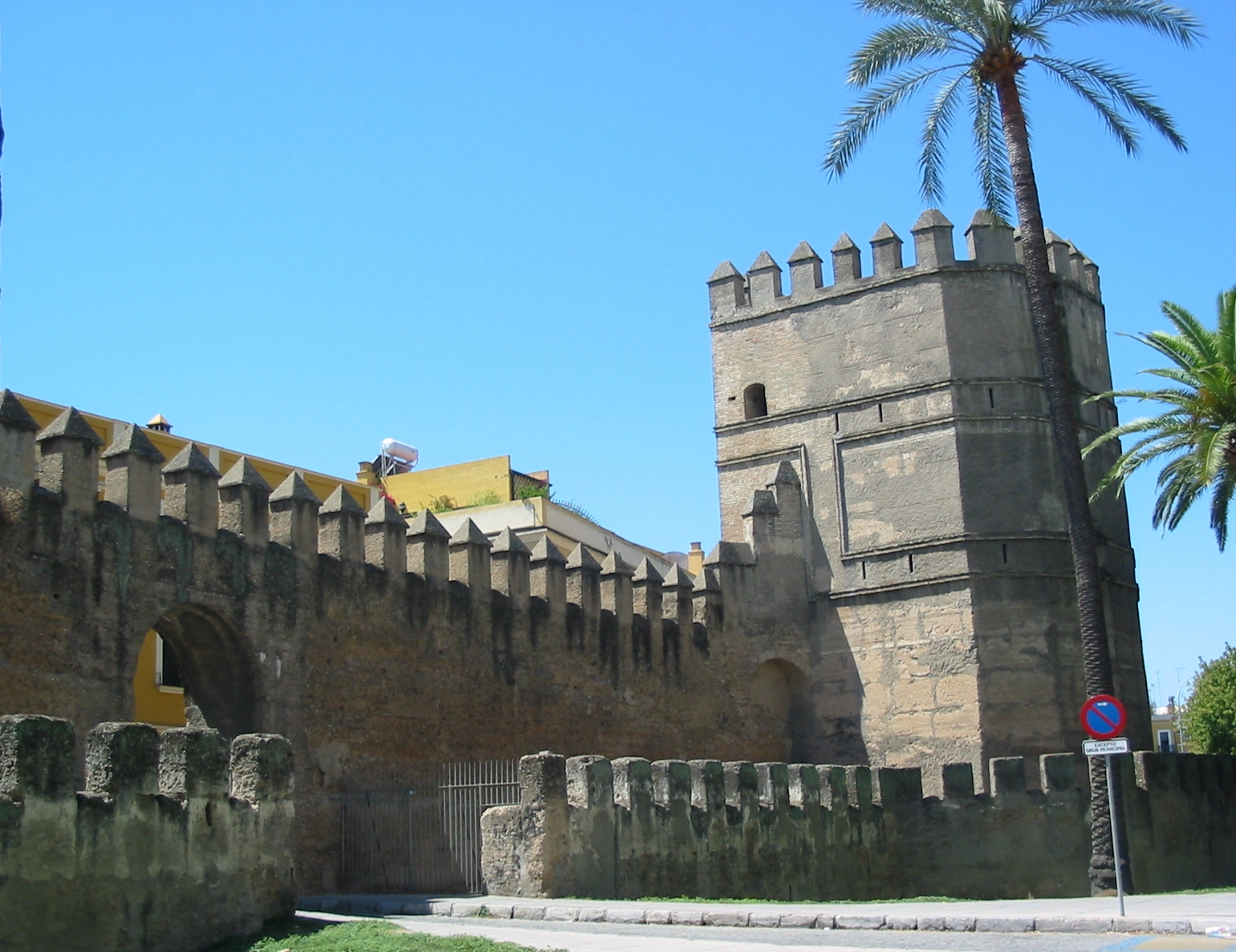
City Walls and the Torre Blanca in the barrio de la Macarena. In this image, seen one of the two postigos opened to promote communication in the intramural area with the new round.

After the Christian reconquest of the city by Ferdinand III of Castile in 1248, the Crown of Castile kept the physiognomy of the walls that had been imposed by the Arabs during its construction, and as was usual in the Kingdom of Castile, the successive monarchs swore the privileges of the city at take possession of it in some of its gates, always those of greater social or strategic importance, as symbol of power. In the Puerta de la Macarena swore Isabella I of Castile (1477), Ferdinand II of Aragon (1508), Charles V, Holy Roman Emperor and his fiancée Isabella of Portugal (1526), and finally Philip IV (1624), while the Puerta de Goles did Philip II (1570), why it was renamed Puerta Real.

During the reign of Charles V, Holy Roman Emperor carried out a major refurbishment of the public or royal gates of the Walls to integrate them into the widening promoted by the monarch in the cities and towns, in order to facilitate the transit of such common carriages in the period. These renovations affected the Puerta de Carmona, that the Puerta de la Carne, the Puerta Real, the Puerta del Arenal, the Postigo del Aceite, where Benvenuto Tortello made works in 1572, and Postigo del Carbón, which was moved from the beginning from the calle Santander until the end of it, as happened with the Puerta de Triana, originally on calle Zaragoza, which was transferred in 1585 farther north, at the confluence of that calle with de San Pablo.

=== Last period before being partially torn down: 17th-19th centuries ===
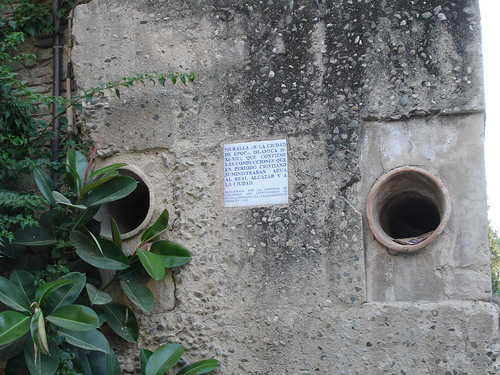
Pipes inside the Walls near the Alcazar of Seville

Eventually the military importance of the walls declined, and they were instead valued for the protection they offered against the flooding of the Guadalquivir river. They also had a commercial function, enabling the regulation of traffic passing in and out of the city. This facilitated the collection of taxes attendant on the movement of people and goods, notably the portazgo and the alcabala; it also became a sanitary barrier, used in the control of disease.

In the 18th century the gates were remodelled. The Puerta del Arenal was rebuilt, and a small chapel was opened on the right side of the Postigo del Aceite, where a baroque altarpiece with the image of the Immaculate Conception (patron of barrio del Arenal) was placed, designed by Pedro Roldán; finally the Puerta de San Fernando was raised to the height of the Royal Tobacco Factory.

In 1836, during the invasion of Andalusia by Carlist forces, a moat with a drawbridge was dug near the Puerta de la Macarena in order to strengthen it; at this point the Walls were still intact. From the 1868 revolution onwards, the walls were demolished, primarily due to the growth of the city; a stretch of the wall of the wall from the Macarena to the Puerta de Córdoba survived, including seven square towers and one octagonal one, as well as some sections in the Jardines del Valle and near the Alcazar. Furthermore, the towers Torre Abd el Aziz, Torre de la Plata, Torre del Oro and Torre Blanca, once part of the walled enclosure, remain.

== Gates and porticoes of access to the city ==
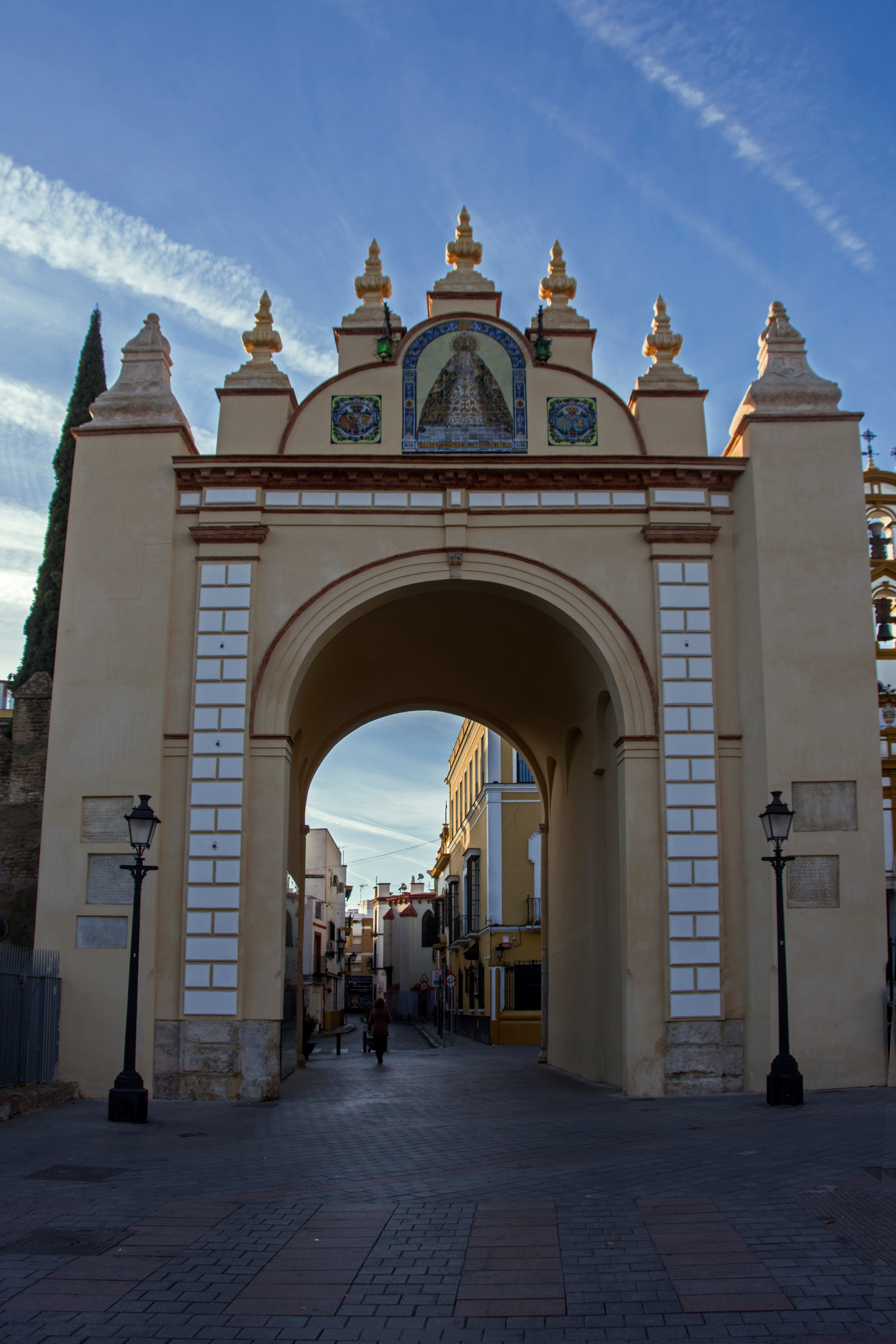
Puerta de la Macarena next to the Basilica of its name.

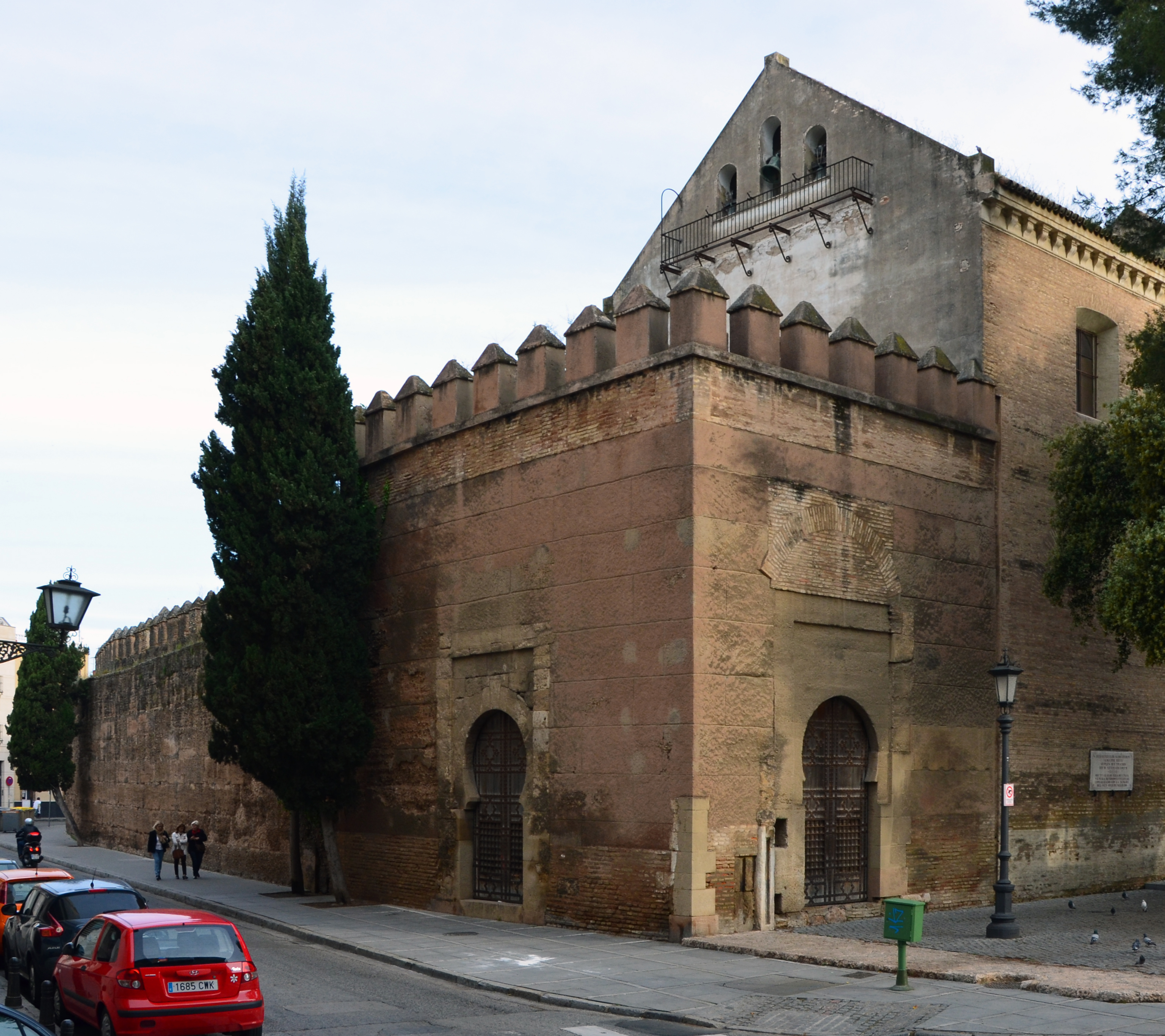
Puerta de Córdoba, adjacent to the Iglesia de San Hermenegildo.

The access to the city was mainly performed by the called postigos and gates, which were of two types: royals or public, and private. The gates had its layered access, as seen on the Puerta de Córdoba, and lacked decoration. Between gates (puertas) and postigos counted the city with 19 accesses:

Wall city gates

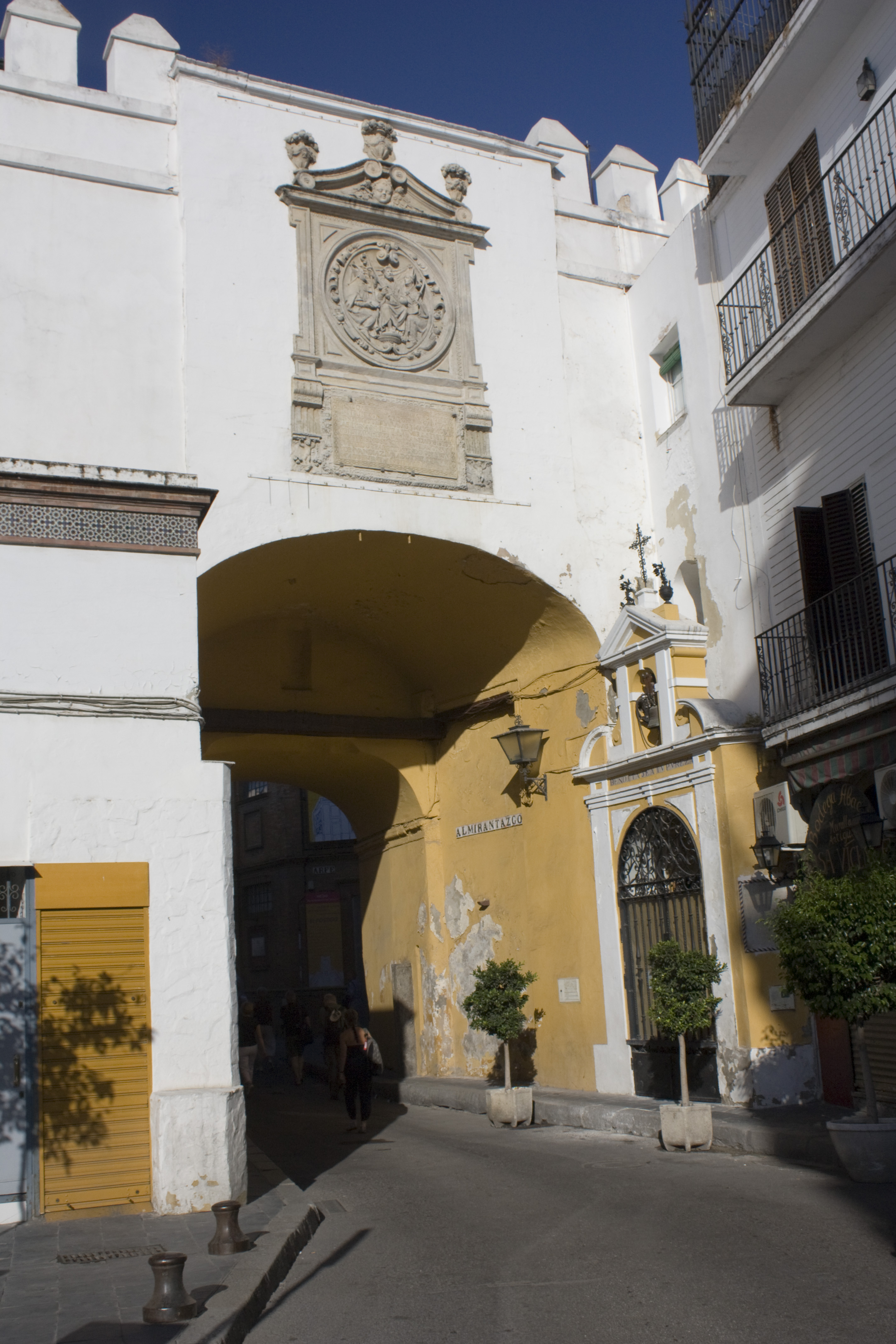
Postigo del Aceite.

- Puerta de la Almenilla, of Almoravid origin was constantly reformed; also called Puerta de la Barqueta, it was in the calle Calatrava, in the plazoleta del Blanquillo.
- Puerta del Arenal, of Almoravid origin and rebuilt in the 16th century and in the 18th century; It was located at the calle Castelar with the calle García de Vinuesa.
- Puerta de Carmona, of Almoravid origin, completely renovated in the 16th century and demolished in 1868; was located at the corner of the calles de San Esteban with Menéndez Pelayo.
- Puerta de la Carne, of Almoravid origin and completely renovated in the 16th century; it was in the calle Menéndez Pelayo, up to calle Santa María la Blanca.
- Puerta de Córdoba, of Almoravid origin and reformed in the 16th century; located opposite the Convento de los Capuchinos, it is one that best preserved the original arrangement.
- Puerta de Jerez, of Caliphate origin; It was located at the west end of the calle de San Gregorio, towards the river. It had engraved some allusive verses to the history of the city.
- Puerta de la Macarena, of Almoravid origin and renovated in the 18th century; located opposite the Basílica de La Macarena.
- Puerta Osario, of Almoravid origin, it was located between calles Valle and Puñonrostro.
- Puerta Real, of Almoravid origin and rebuilt in the 16th century, also called Puerta de Goles; It was in the corner of the calle Goles with the calle Alfonso XII.
- Puerta de San Fernando, built in the 18th century it was the most modern; It was located at the height of the Royal Tobacco Factory.
- Puerta de San Juan, of Almoravid origin; It was located on the calle Guadalquivir, between the calle San Vicente and Torneo.
- Puerta del Sol, of Almoravid origin and reformed in the 16th century; it was located at the end of the calle Sol, and its name comes from the sun that had engraved on the lintel.
- Puerta de Triana, of Almoravid origin and rebuilt in 1585 further north, was torn down in 1868; It was in the current calle Zaragoza, at the confluence with the calle Moratín, where today is indicated.

Postigos (secondaries wall city gates)

- Postigo del Aceite, of Almoravid origin and very reformed; well known for being the place where it entered the oil; It is near the Correos building.
- Postigo del Alcázar, of Almohad origin, replaced the Caliphate tower-gate; It was also known as postigo de la Torre del Agua, del callejón de la Judería or de la huerta del Retiro. It is located in the calle Judería.
- Postigo del Carbón, of Almoravid origin, it moved in the 16th century from beginning to end of the calle Santander, formerly known as del Carbón, that took the name .
- Postigo de la Feria, also called postigo de la Basura, it was at the end of the calle Feria, corner of calle Bécquer.
- Postigo del Jabón, located in the vicinity of the calle Tintes.

== Preserved sections of the walls ==
Section from Puerta de la Macarena to the Puerta de Córdoba

This is the most extensive and best preserved section (with the exception of two postigo), includes the puertas de la Macarena and de Córdoba, the latter attached to the iglesia de San Hermenegildo, being this gate the best preserved of the Caliphate period; also it includes several towers, among which the Torre Blanca.

Section of the Jardines del Valle

It is the second section of greater length, was hidden from view in the inside of the Convento del Valle, belonging to the order of the Franciscans, which was confiscated in the 19th century, being acquired by the Marquise of Villanueva who donated for the establishment of a school of religious of the sacred heart; that college disappeared in the middle of the 20th century, becoming some time later in the current Jardines del Valle (Gardens of the Valley).

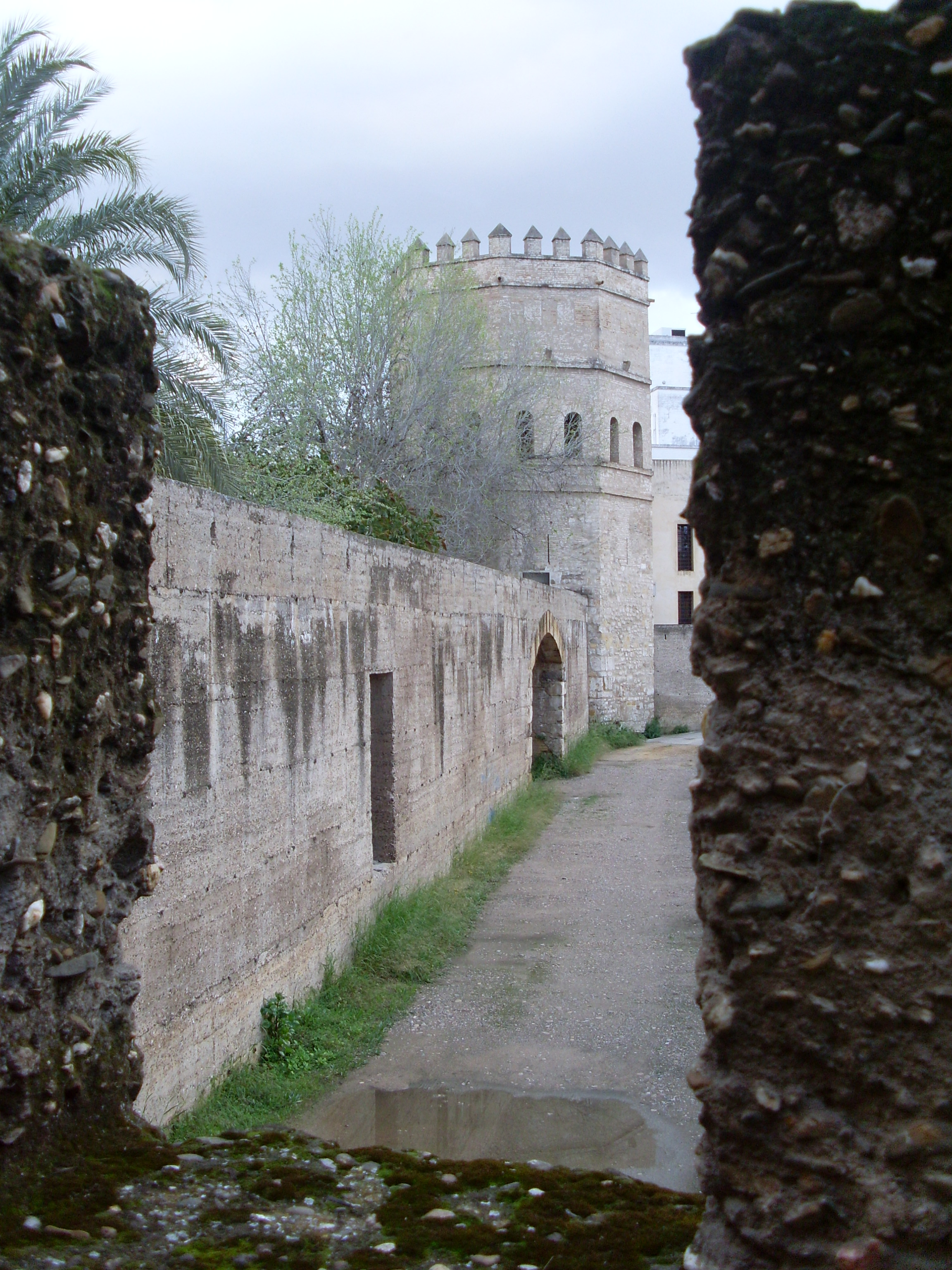
Preserved sections of the walls next to the Torre de la Plata.

Walls of the alcázar

It must distinguish three types of walls in the alcázar;

• Of ashlar, probably recovered from the early Roman walls, visible near puerta del León area.
• The areas of mud made by the Almohads, some visible, as in the calle Judería, and calle Agua and others that are not visible because these are hidden by buildings of Calle San Fernando -except in some that are public-. Parallel to the walls of the alcázar, was the walls of the city, whose remains were found during works of the Metro, leaving again buried.
• Other rear walls, which close the gardens of the alcázar regarding the jardines de Murillo (gardens of Murillo).
Curtain wall attached to the Torre Abd el Aziz

It is a small curtain wall, visible inside the shop of the building that stands next to the tower.

Postigo del Aceite

The third of the exterior gates of the walls that remains today.

Section in the Plaza del Cabildo

It is a small section of about 50 meters, visible from the plaza del cabildo, as well as from the back street, includes a tower.

Section attached to the Torre de la Plata

This section includes the startup of the Postigo del Carbón, and part of the walls that joined the Torre de la Plata with the Torre del Oro. In this area, were discovered in 2012 the remains of a new tower, dating from the late 11th or early 12th century.

Start of the Puerta Real

It is a small curtain wall at the confluence of the calles Alfonso XIII and Goles.

== See also ==
- List of Bien de Interés Cultural in the Province of Seville
