= Holy Week in Seville =

Religious festival in Seville, Spain

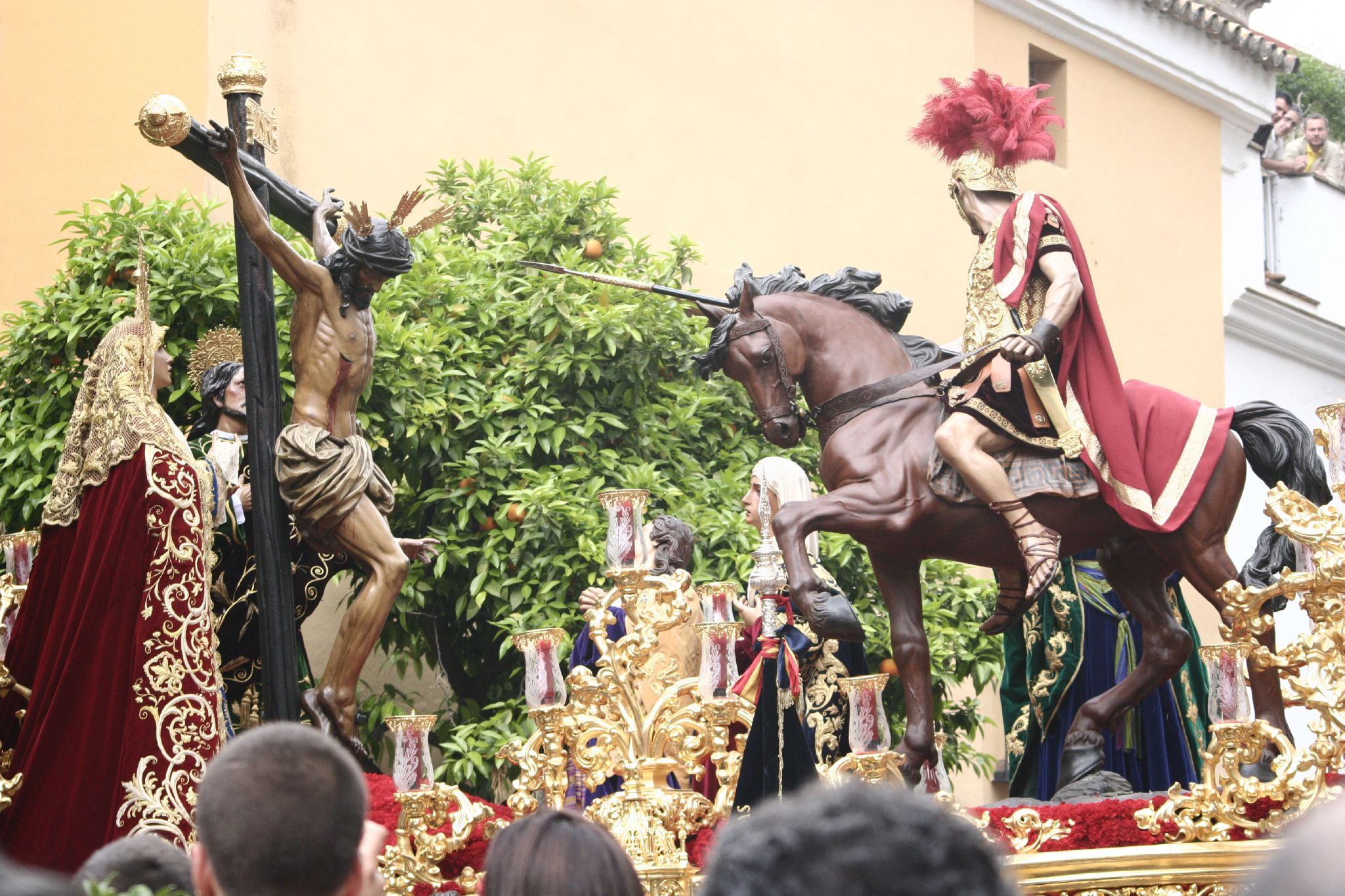
- Misterio de la Sagrada Lanzada de Nuestro Señor Jesucristo y Nuestra Señora de Guía
- Official name: Semana Santa de Sevilla
- Observed by: Seville, Spain
- Type: Religious, Historical, Cultural
- Significance: Commemoration of the passion, death and resurrection of Jesus
- Celebrations: Processions
- Begins: Palm Sunday
- Ends: Easter Sunday
- 2025 date: April 13 – April 20
- 2026 date: March 29 – April 5
- 2027 date: March 21 – March 28
- 2028 date: April 9 – April 16
- Frequency: Annual

Holy Week in Seville (Spanish: Semana Santa de Sevilla) is one of two biggest annual festivals in Sevilla, Andalucía, Spain, the other being the Feria de Abril (April Fair), which follows two weeks later. It is celebrated in the week leading up to Easter (Holy Week among Christians), and features the procession of pasos, floats of lifelike wooden sculptures of individual scenes of sorrowful Mysteries of the Rosary, or images of the grieving Virgin Mary.

Some of the sculptures are of great antiquity, considered artistic masterpieces, and hold cultural and spiritual significance for the local Catholic population.

== The processions ==
There are up to three pasos in each procession. The pasos dedicated to Jesus use figures of wood, wax, and wire to depict scenes from the Passion, and are usually covered in gold. The pasos dedicated to the Virgin Mary are usually covered in silver, and depict Mary weeping for her Son and sometimes holding Him in her arms.

The processions are organized by hermandades and cofradías, religious brotherhoods. Members precede the pasos dressed in penitential robes with capirotes, tall, pointed hoods with eye-holes. The capirotes were designed so the faithful could repent in anonymity, without being recognised as self-confessed sinners.

Nearly 70 cofradias (church brotherhoods) take part, each with their own image, as well as colourful misterios (tableaux of bible scenes), on elaborately decorated pasos (floats). They may be accompanied by brass bands. The processions follow a designated route from their home-churches and chapels to the cathedral, usually via a central viewing area and back. The ones from the suburban barrios may take 14 hours to return to their home churches.

The processions continue from Palm Sunday to Easter Sunday morning. The climax of the week is the night of Holy Thursday, when the processions set out to arrive at the cathedral on the dawn of Good Friday, known as the madrugá.

=== The marching order ===
The core events in Semana Santa are the processions of the brotherhoods, known as estación de penitencia (stations of penance), from their home church or chapel to the cathedral of Seville and back. The last section before arriving to the cathedral is common to all brotherhoods and is known as the Carrera Oficial.

The standard structure of a procession is:

- A great cross (the so-called Cruz de Guía – Guiding Cross) is carried at the beginning of each procession.
- A number of people (sometimes barefoot) dressed in a habit and with the distinctive pointed hood (capirote), and holding long wax candles (only lit by night), marching in silence. These are the nazarenos. Colours, forms and details of the habit are distinctive for each brotherhood – and sometimes for different locations within the procession. Usually the Nazarenos march in pairs, and are grouped behind the insignia. Moving between the lines are diputados de tramo, guardians who maintain the organization of the formations.
- A group of altar boys, acolytes, dressed in vestments (many of them wearing dalmatics), with chandeliers and incense, and other servants.
- The Paso. A float or platform that carries sculptures depicting scenes from the Passion of Christ or the Virgin Mary. These floats are an integral part of the processions during Holy Week. They are often large and ornate and carried through the streets by members of religious brotherhoods or cofradías. Each paso is a work of art and devotion, and they play a central role in the elaborate and solemn processions that take place during the week.
- When applicable, the musical group follows (bands) or precedes the paso (chapel wind ensemble).
- A number of penitentes, carrying wooden crosses, making public penance. They wear the habit and the hood of the brotherhood, but unlike the nazarenos, they do not have a pointed hood.

This structure repeats itself depending on the number of pasos (up to three). Usually the last paso is not followed by penitentes, and the procession should be closed -presided- by the titular chaplain in full processional vestments known as el preste

Although this is the standard structure, depending on the traditions of each brotherhood, details (and even the plan) may vary.

A procession can be made up from a few hundred to near 3,000 Nazarenos and last anywhere from 4 to 14 hours, depending how far the home church is from the cathedral. The largest processions can take over an hour and a half to cross one particular spot.

=== The paso ===
At the centre of each procession are the pasos, an image or set of images set atop a moveable float of wood.

The first one would be a sculpted scene of the sorrowful Mysteries of the Rosary:

1. The Agony in the Garden.
2. The Scourging at the Pillar.
3. The Crowning with Thorns.
4. The Carrying of the Cross.
5. The Crucifixion and Death of our Lord.

The structure of the paso is richly carved and decorated with fabric, flowers and candles.

The sculptures themselves are carved and painted, and often lifesize or larger. The oldest surviving were carved in the 16th century, though new images continue to be added. Those highly regarded artistically include the Nuestro Padre Jesús del Gran Poder and Santísimo Cristo de la Buena Muerte by Juan de Mesa y Velasco, Francisco Antonio Ruíz Gijón's Santísimo Cristo de la Expiración (known as El Cachorro), and the two virgins named Nuestra Señora de la Esperanza from Macarena and Triana. All of the principal images of the Semana Santa are on display for veneration in their home churches all year round.

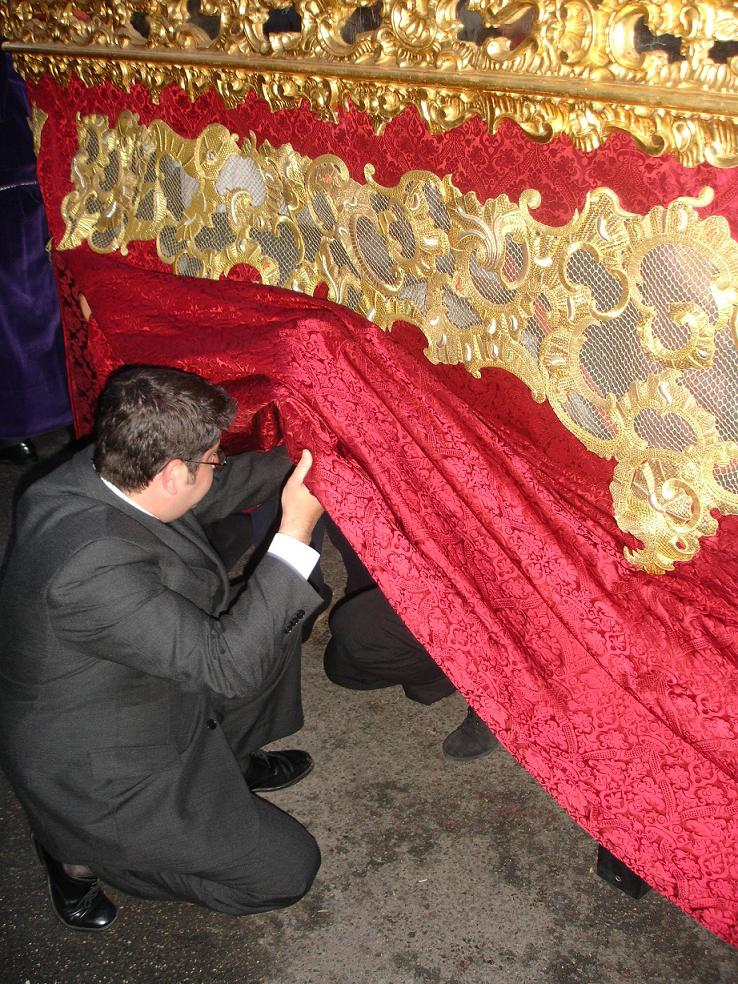
Overseer giving orders to the costaleros

A distinctive feature of Semana Santa in Seville is the style of marching of the pasos. A team of men, the costaleros (literally "sack men", for their distinctive – and functional – headdress), supporting the beams upon their shoulders and necks, lift, move and lower the paso. As they are all inside the structure and hidden from the external view by a curtain, the paso seems to move by itself. On the outside an overseer (capataz), guides the team by voice, or through a ceremonial hammer el llamador (caller) attached to the paso.

Depending on weight (most weigh over a tonne), a paso requires between twenty-four and fifty-four costaleros to move. Each brotherhood has a distinctive way to raise and move a paso, and even each paso within the procession.

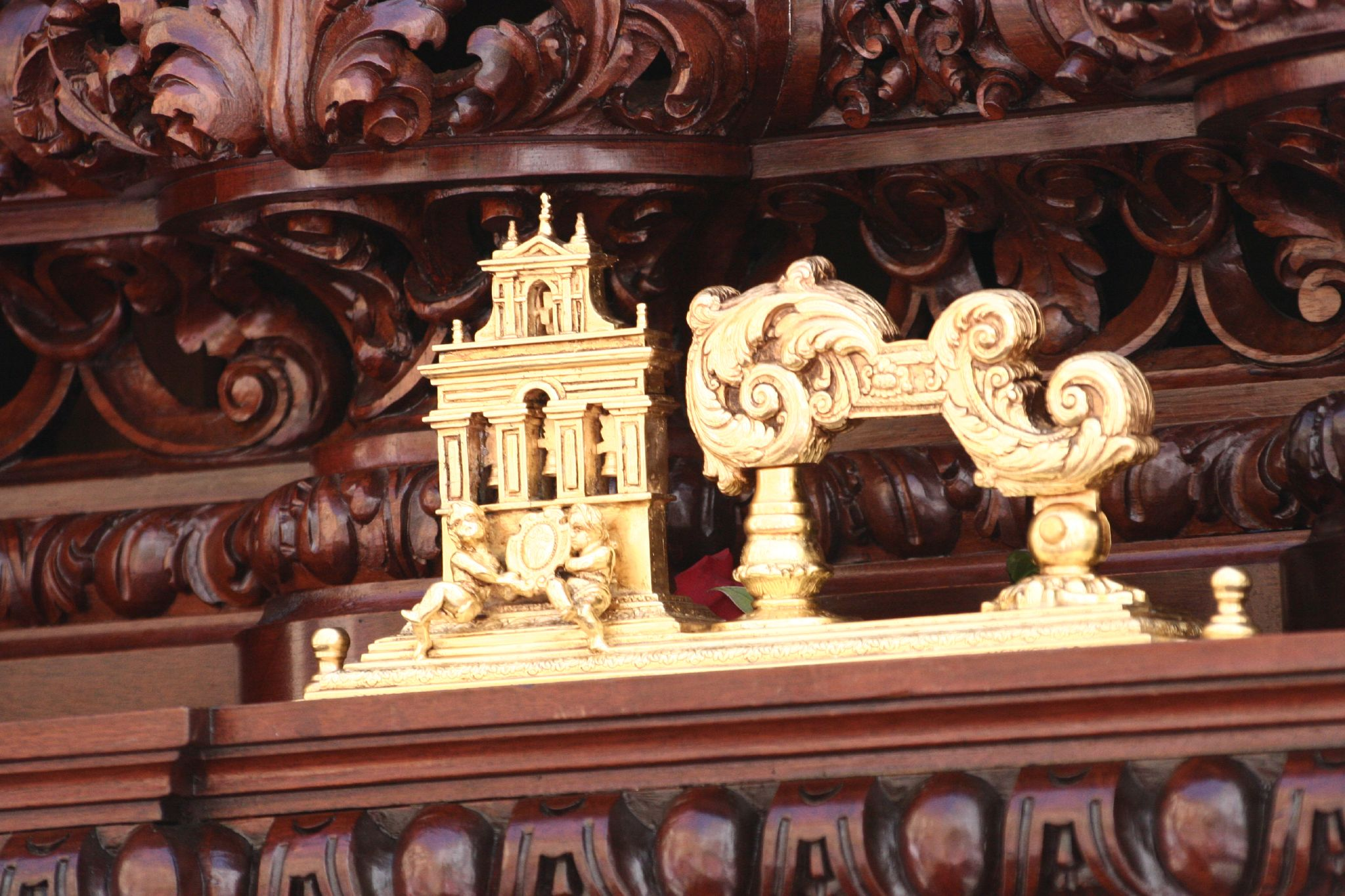
Golden 'caller'

=== The music ===
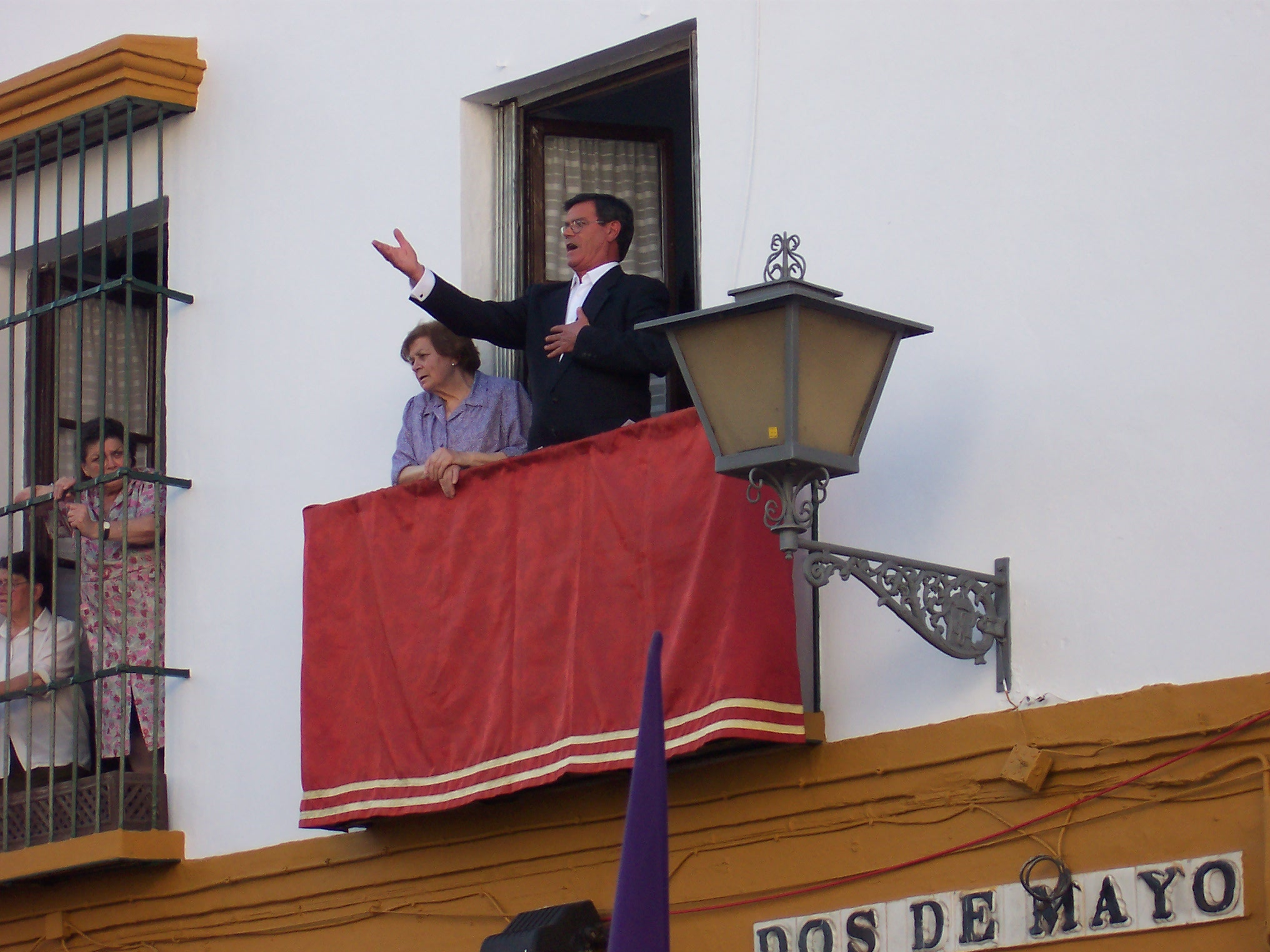
Singing a saeta

Some processions are silent, with no musical accompaniment, some have a cappella choirs or wind quartets, but many (and especially those historically associated with poorer neighbourhoods) feature a drum and trumpet band behind the image of Christ and a brass band behind the Virgin playing hymns or marchas from a standard repertoire Those associated with the images of Christ are often funeral in nature, while those associated with the Virgin are more celebratory.

As each procession leaves its home church, (an event known as the salida), at its return (the entrada), and along the march route, improvised flamenco-style songs may be offered by individuals in the crowd or from a balcony. These songs are generically called saetas (arrows).

Whenever the images depart or arrive at their home churches or chapels, Marcha Real, the national anthem, is played and proper courtesy is done for both the images and the performance of the anthem.

=== The official route ===
Many of the processions pass through an official viewing area which occupies some of the city's main streets, beginning in Campana, followed by Calle Sierpes, Plaza San Francisco, and Avenida de la Constitución, before reaching the cathedral. Due to the increasingly tight schedule over the week, and also the urban growth of the city, a number of recently formed brotherhoods have to process in Passiontide before Palm Sunday and do not march into the cathedral at all.

== Traditional dress ==
The traditional suit worn by women on Thursday (and sometimes on Good Friday) is known as La Mantilla (the mantle). This custom has become revitalised since the 1980s. The outfit consists of the lace mantle, stiffened by shell or another material, and a black dress, usually mid-leg, with black shoes. It is expected for the woman to hold and show a rosary. Jewelry may include, at most, bracelets and earrings.

== The days of Holy Week ==
Below is a list of the brotherhoods which make penance each day, as of 2010, with the traditional year of establishment (or first procession to the cathedral for those found in the last century), and a few notes. The names in the list are those in common usage.

They are ordered in the same sequence as they enter the cathedral. Unlike other locations, this sequence is not related to the scenes of the Passion their images depict, but on a historically grown set of rules of precedence, tradition, canonical needs, agreements between brotherhoods and logistical considerations.

Rain (or serious menace of) may affect the processions, some may seek refuge to a nearby church or landmarks and wait for a perfect time to go back to their church, or the Hermano Mayor may fully suspend the procession. There are 11 days of Holy Week as follows:

=== Friday of Sorrows ===
- Pino Montano. (Mountain Pine) 1982.
- Pasión y Muerte (Passion and Death). 1991.
- Cristo de la Corona (The Crown). 1989
- La Misión (The Mission). 1949.
- Bendición y Esperanza (Blessing and Hope). 1992.

=== Saturday of Passion ===
- La Milagrosa (The Miraculous). 1998.
- Divino Perdón (Divine Forgiveness). 1992.
- Dolores de Torreblanca (Sorrows of Torreblanca). 1961.
- Padre Pío (Padre Pio). 1986.
- Agrupación Parroquial Rosario de San Jerónimo (Parish Association Rosary of San Jerónimo). 2015.

=== Palm Sunday ===
- La Borriquita (The Little She-Donkey) depicting Christ's triumphal entry into Jerusalem. The nazarenos corp is exclusively formed by children (except guardians and costaleros). The first section of the Hermandad del Amor that goes out in procession.
- Jesús Despojado (Jesus Stripped). 1936.
- La Paz (The Peace). 1939. The paso represents the moment when they are giving Jesus the cross. It is also the first one to go out.
- La Cena (The Supper). 1591.
- La Hiniesta (The Broom). 1412. The paso represents the moment when Jesus is dead on the cross and Mary Magdalene cries below.
- San Roque (Saint Roch). 1901.
- La Estrella (The Star). 1560. Also known as the Valiente (Brave), since it was the only brotherhood which processed in 1932.
- La Amargura (The Bitterness). Late 17th century. The María Santísima de la Amargura was the first Dolorosa to be canonically crowned, in 1954.
- El Amor (The Love). 1508.

=== Holy Monday ===
- San Pablo (Saint Paul). 2008
- La Redención (The Redemption). 1959.
- Santa Genoveva (Saint Genevieve). 1958. This brotherhood's image of the captive Christ is usually escorted by a sizable number of street-dressed women undertaking private penance.
- Santa Marta (Saint Martha). 1946. The nazarenos of Santa Marta dress in black because their paso depicts the transportation of Christ's body to the tomb. As of 2007, the only brotherhood whose costaleros are still de jure paid for the task.
- San Gonzalo (Saint Gundisalvus). 1943
- Vera+Cruz (True Cross). Founded in 1448 and revived in the early 20th century.
- Las Penas (The Pains). 1875.
- Las Aguas (The Waters). 1750.
- El Museo. (The Museum) 1575.

=== Tuesday of Holy Week ===
- El Cerro del Águila (The Hill of the Eagle). 1989. It is the brotherhood travelling furthest to make station; the procession lasts some 14 hours.
- San Benito (Saint Benedict). Founded by shipbuilders in Triana in the 16th century.

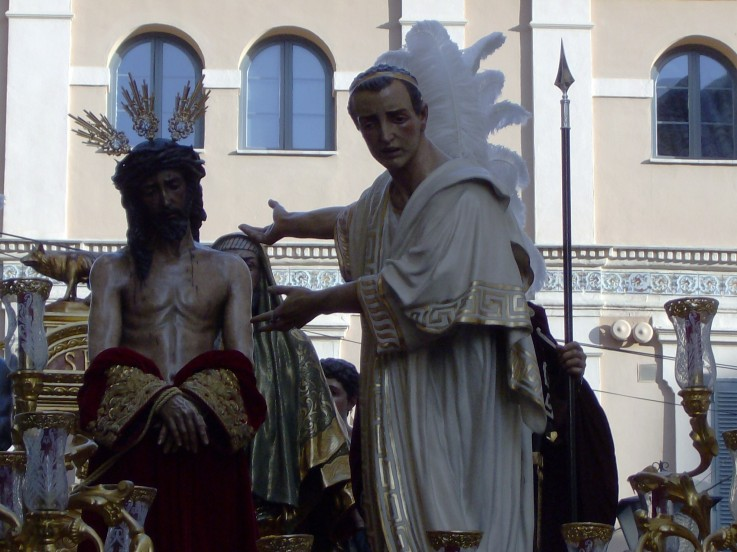
The Pilatos's Paso from San Benito

- El Dulce Nombre (The Sweet Name). 1584. It is known popularly as the Bofetá (slap in the face) because its current paso represents the moment when, after Jesus has been detained, he is slapped in the face by a servant.
- La Candelaria (The Candlemas). 1922.
- San Esteban (Saint Stephen). 1926.
- Los Javieres (The Xaviers). 1946.
- Los Estudiantes (The Students). 1924. The image of Cristo de la Buena Muerte (1620) is considered the masterwork of Juan de Mesa y Velasco.
- Santa Cruz (Holy Cross). 1904.

=== Wednesday of Holy Week ===
- El Carmen (The Carmel). 2007
- El Buen Fin (The Good End). 1590.
- La Sed (The Thirst). 1979.
- San Bernardo. (Saint Bernard) 1748.
- La Sagrada Lanzada (The Holy Lance Thrust). 1591.
- El Baratillo (The Secondhand Shop). 1693.
- Cristo de Burgos (Christ of Burgos). 1883. The Christ is considered the masterpiece of Juan Bautista Vázquez el Viejo (16th century).
- Los Panaderos (The Bakers). 18th century.
- Las Siete Palabras (The Seven Words). 1561.

=== Holy Thursday ===
- Los Negritos (The Little black people). Prior to 1400. Up to the mid 19th century, only black people (both free and slave) could be full members.
- La Exaltación (The Exaltation). 16th century. Nicknamed los caballos (the horses).
- Las Cigarreras (The Cigarmakers). 1563. It is the brotherhood of this day with the fewest nazarenes. The image of the María Santísima de la Victoria Coronada is considered by several experts as one of the most beautiful in the city.
- Monte-Sión (Mount Zion). 1560.
- Quinta Angustia (Fifth Anguish). 1541.
- El Valle (The Valley). 1590.
- Pasión (Passion). 1531. The image of Nuestro Padre Jesús de la Pasión is a masterpiece of Juan Martínez Montañés.

=== Good Friday (early hours) La Madrugá ===
Starting a little while after midnight into Good Friday, and lasting sometimes until midday, the Madruga (dawn) is the high point of the processions in Seville.

- El Silencio (The Silence). 1340. Considered the oldest existing brotherhood. The whole procession is followed by the watching crowd in silence. Penitents and the Nuestro Padre Jesús Nazareno image carry the Cross backwards (embracing it).
- El Gran Poder (The Great Power). 1431. The image of Nuestro Padre Jesús del Gran Poder is one of the most venerated in Seville and elsewhere. It's called "El Señor de Sevilla" ("The Lord of Sevilla" in English). This image has got a lot of followers.
- La Macarena. 1595. The most popular image of the Virgin in Sevilla. It's called "La Señora de Sevilla" ("The Lady of Sevilla" in English). Her presence arouses passion in the watching crowds. At 14 hours, it is one of the longest, and also one of the most applauded.
- El Calvario (The Calvary). 1571. The smallest and shortest procession of the night.
- La Esperanza de Triana (The Hope of Triana). 1418. The Virgin of Triana. She is also known as the "Reina, Madre y Capitana de Triana" (Queen Mother and Captain of Triana). A long and festive procession.
- Los Gitanos (The Gypsies). 1753. Even now, the hermano mayor (principal of the brotherhood) is expected to be a gypsy.

=== Good Friday ===
- La Carretería (The Cartwright's Shop). 1550.
- Soledad de San Buenaventura (The Loneliness of San Buenaventura). 1847.
- El Cachorro (The Puppy). 1689. The image of the crucified expiring Christ, made in 1682 by Francisco Ruiz Gijón, is a masterpiece.
- La O (The O) 1566. It was the first brotherhood of Triana to process across the river to Sevilla, on April 9, 1830.
- Tres Caídas de San Isidoro (Three Falls of Saint Isidore). 1605.
- Montserrat. 1601.
- Sagrada Mortaja (Sacred Shroud). 1692.

=== Holy Saturday ===
- El Sol (The Sun) 2010.
- Los Servitas (The Servites) 1696.
- La Trinidad (The Trinity) 1507.
- Santo Entierro (Holy Burial) c. 1570. With representatives of public authorities, civic bodies and legations from most other brotherhoods. Traditionally founded by King Saint Ferdinand III.
- La Soledad de San Lorenzo (The Loneliness of Saint Lawrence). 16th century.

=== Easter Sunday ===
- La Sagrada Resurrección (The Holy Resurrection). 1969. It is the last of the brotherhoods to make their procession, ending Holy Week celebrations.

== History ==
The origins of the penitential Holy Week in Seville are to be found in the late Middle Ages (from 1350 onwards), but details are scarce.

By 1578 already over 30 brotherhoods performed penitential processions during the Holy Week.

By 1604 Cardinal Fernando Niño de Guevara, gave the first ordinances mandating all Sevillan confraries to make a stop in the cathedral (and at St. Anna those of Triana) and assigning certain time frames for this (from Wednesday to Good Friday).

In the 20th century the forms of Holy Week were revived. In the anticlerical period of the Second Spanish Republic, churches, images and goods were destroyed on July 18, 1936, and thereabouts. There were changes in the period immediately following the II Vatican Council, which coincided with the social changes in Spain around the death of Francisco Franco.

== See also ==
- Seville
- Holy Week in Spain
- Via Crucis to the Cruz del Campo
- Capirote

== Bibliography ==
- Webster, Susan Verdi (1998). Art and Ritual in Golden-Age Spain: Sevillian Confraternities and the Processional Sculpture of Holy Week. Princeton University Press. ISBN 978-0691048192
- Almela Vinet, Francisco (2003). Historia de la Semana Santa en Sevilla : descripción de las cofradías que hacen estación durante la misma a la Santa Iglesia Catedral (1899). Ediciones Espuela de Plata (Editorial Renacimiento). ISBN 84-96133-04-4
- Carrero Rodríguez, Juan (1981). Gran Diccionario de la Semana Santa. Editorial Almuzara. ISBN 84-88586-31-0
- Martínez Kleiser, Luis (2003). La Semana Santa de Sevilla (1924). Ediciones Espuela de Plata (Editorial Renacimiento). ISBN 84-96133-05-2
- Sánchez Herrero, José. La Semana Santa de Sevilla. Editorial Sílex. ISBN 84-7737-120-2
- Various authors (2003). Recuerda Semana Santa de Sevilla. Editorial Everest S.A. ISBN 84-241-0071-9
- Antonio M. Rueda, Professor of Spanish Linguistics and Literature.
- Michener, James A., and Robert Vavra. Iberia. London (57 Uxbridge Rd, W.5): Corgi, 1971. Print.
