= Puerta Real (Seville) =

Former city gate of Seville, Spain

Coordinates: 37°23′36″N 6°00′05″W

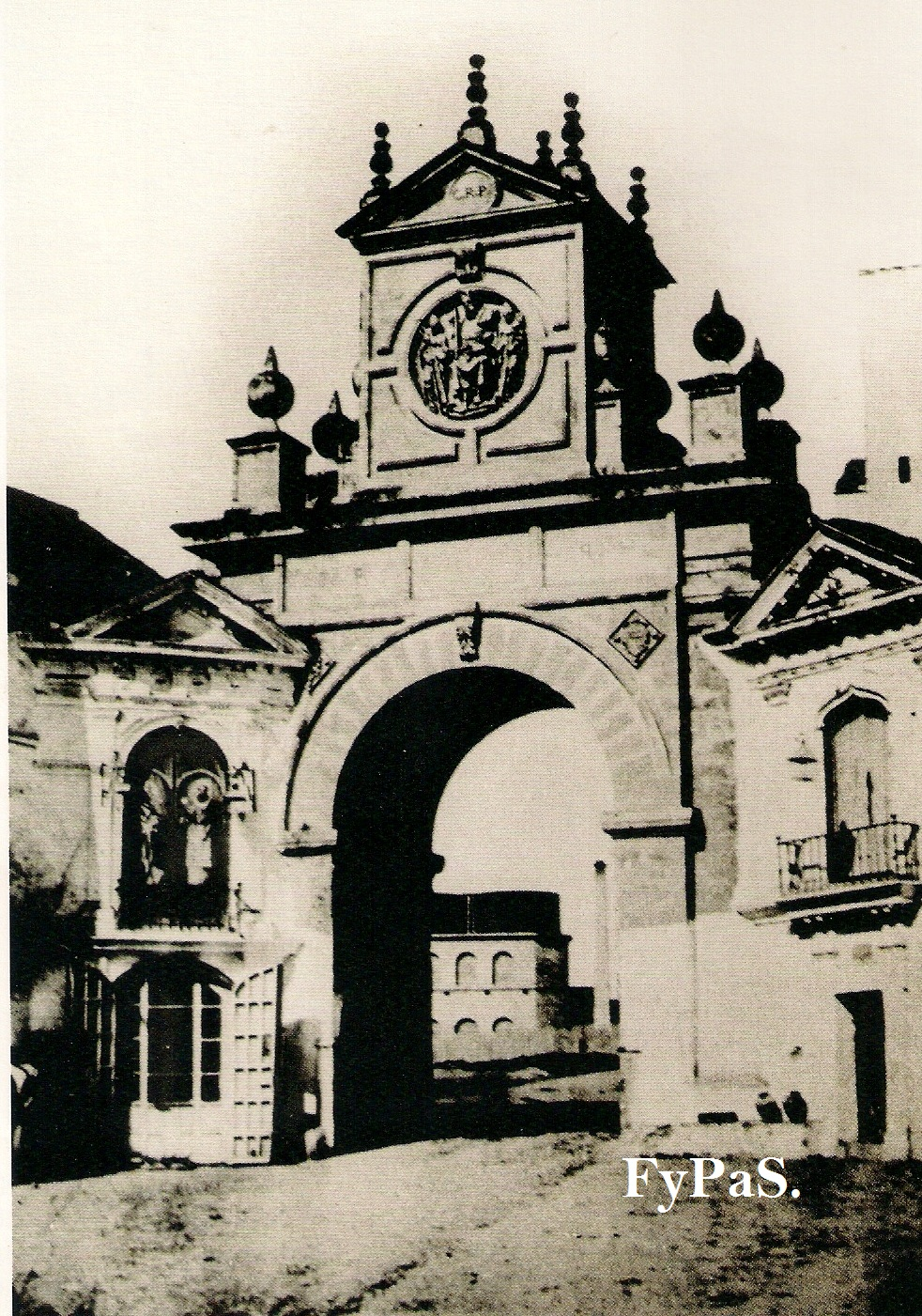
Puerta Real in 1850 (before its demolition to "urbanize" the city) photographed by Joseph de Vigier.

The Puerta Real, called until 1570 as Puerta de Goles (believed to be a Muslim degeneration of the name of Hercules, whose effigy crowned the gate), was one of the gates of the walled enclosure of the city of Seville (Andalusia). It was located at the confluence of the calles de Alfonso XII, Gravina, Goles and San Laureano, and today only is it a cloth of the wall on which it was based, in which there is embedded a stone that was part of the gate.

It is considered one of the gates that arose during the expansion of the Sultan Ali ibn Yusuf (1083-1143) and, therefore from the Almoravid time of the city. The historians Rodrigo Caro and Peraza, rely on a legend; they attribute its origin to Julius Caesar, considering the name Goles as a degeneration of Hercules, whom the legend says it was dedicated.

It was completely rebuilt in 1565, eliminating all the military matters before it, and inside it housed a chapel dedicated to the Our Lady of Mercy and another to the Christ of Redemption. It was torn down in 1862, and in 1995 were carried out works on the canvas of existing wall, where states the former existence of the gate.

== From Puerta de Goles to Puerta Real ==
The first official entry and their subsequent swear privileges to the city by the monarchs of Castile was always made through the Puerta de la Macarena. They did in that Isabella I of Castile (1477), Ferdinand II of Aragon (1508), his grandson Charles V, Holy Roman Emperor and the fiancée of he, Isabella of Portugal (1526) that her entry into the city was due to her betrothals, held in the Alcázar the said year.

However, when in entered in the city through it, Ferdinand III of Castile in 1248 on the occasion of the city's conquest. Also in 1570 the commission organize the first and only visit to the city of Philip II, and found several drawbacks to do, like his predecessors, by the Puerta de la Macarena. Without the approval of all, the members of the commission decided that finally, the king made his entrance through this gate instead de la Macarena, giving as reasons the general view that presented the arrabal, added to which was surrounded by narrow streets that caused discomfort for an event of this nature To consequence of this entry, the gate stopped being named as until then, to adopt the name of puerta Real. The monarch Philip IV, who visited the city in 1624 resumed the tradition history, making his swear and entrance through the puerta de la Macarena, so it came only as a special occasion.

== Commemorative plaque ==
It is located at the intersection of the calles San Laureano, Alfonso XII, Gravina and Goles, in a small square in which there is a small remnant of the original Almohad wall, which holds a marble slab, on which is reflected the royal visit.

Ferrea Fernandus prepegit claustra Sevilla Fernandi nomem splendit ut astra polli

In Latin which translates as:

Ferdinand broke the strong gates of Seville, and the name of Ferdinand shines like the stars of heaven

== See also ==
- Walls of Seville
