= Tren de la Costa (Spain) =

Overview
- Status: Planned
- Owner: Adif
- Locale: Spain (Valencian Community)
- Termini: Gandia; Alicante

Service
- Type: Inter-city rail, commuter rail
- Operator(s): Renfe Operadora

Technical
- Line length: 127.7 km (79.3 mi)

The Tren de la Costa (Train of the coast) is a planned railway in the Valencian Community in Spain.

== History ==
The cities of Valencia and Alicante are currently linked by rail via an inland route. The "Tren de la Costa" is the name given to the planned project to extend the Cercanías Valencia C-1 line, which currently terminates at Gandía, to Dénia and eventually Alicante, along the corridor of the AP-7 motorway. The line from Gandía to Denia closed in 1974, however the town is connected to Alicante by Line 9 of the Alicante Tram system.

== Planning ==
A study was produced in 2016 in regard to planning and construction of the line, outlining upgraded stations on the C-1 line at Tavernes de la Valldigna, Xeraco and Gandia, and new stations at Oliva, Dénia and Benidorm before reaching Alicante.

The construction is to be split into four phases. The first consists of installing a third rail to the existing 1,668 mm (5 ft 5 21/32 in) Iberian gauge line from Valencia to Gandia to allow 1,435 mm (4 ft 8 1/2 in) standard gauge operation, and new track from Gandia to Oliva. The second is a new standard-gauge line from Oliva to Dénia; the third from Alicante to Benidorm and the fourth from Benidorm to Dénia. The total cost for all four phases was estimated at €957 million in 2017.

== See also ==
- Cercanías Murcia/Alicante
- Cercanías Valencia
