= Renfe Class 446 =

Commuter train

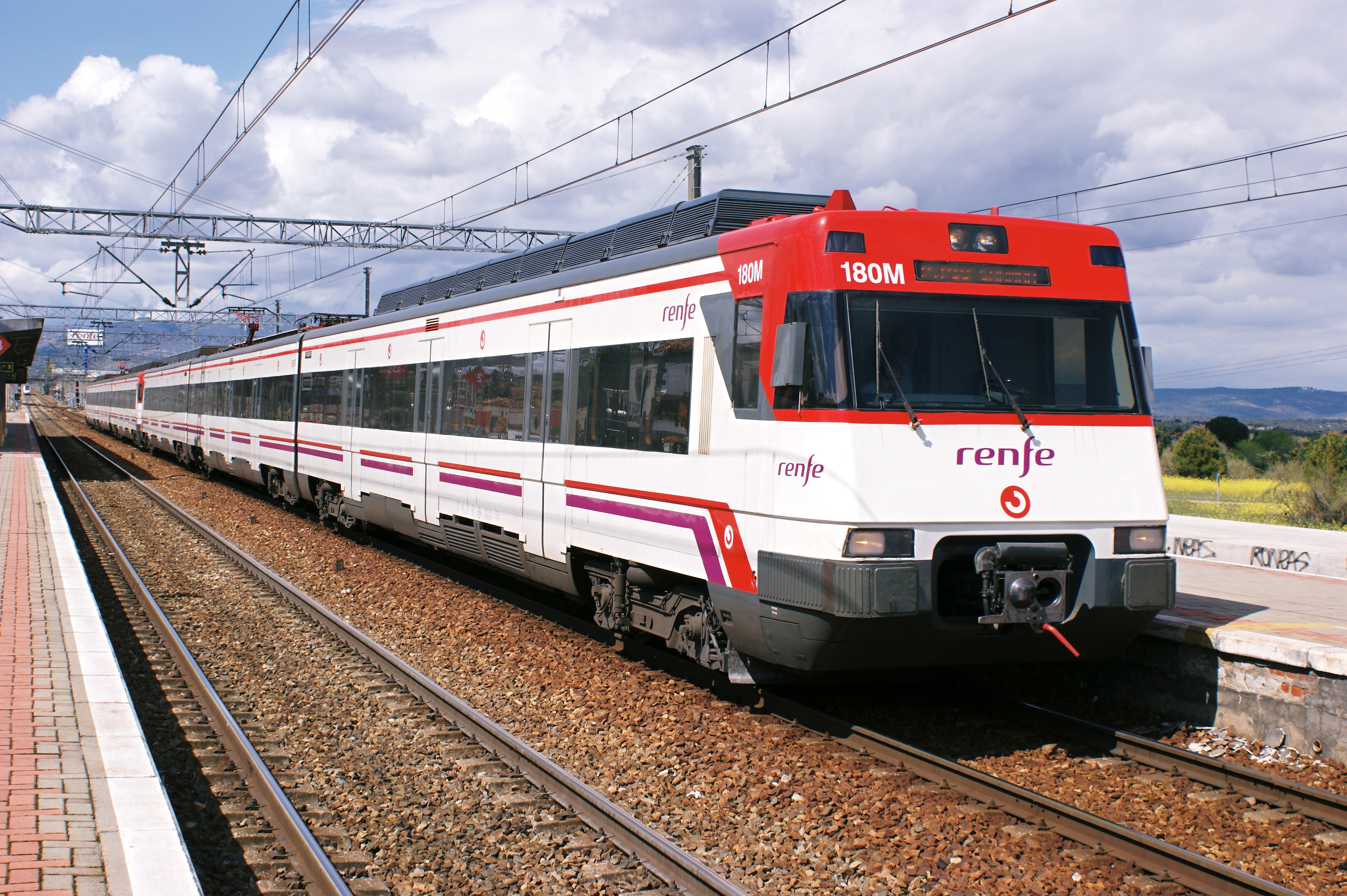
- Cercanias 446.180 at Pinar de Las Rozas station
- Manufacturers: CAF, MACOSA, MTM, Cenemesa, Conelec, Melco
- Constructed: 1989-1993
- Refurbished: 2005
- Number built: 170 sets (510 vehicles)
- Number scrapped: 25
- Formation: 3 cars per set

Specifications
- Train length: 75,993 mm (249 ft 3.9 in)
- Width: 2,940 mm (9 ft 8 in)
- Height: 4,185 mm (13 ft 8.8 in)
- Maximum speed: 100 km/h (62 mph)
- Traction system: Electric
- Traction motors: 4 x GEE 326 A2 per motor coach
- Power output: 2,400 kW or 3,218.5 hp
- Acceleration: 1 m/s²
- Electric system: 3000 V DC Catenary
- Current collection: Pantograph
- UIC classification: Bo'Bo - 2'2' - Bo'Bo'
- Safety systems: ASFA, some LZB (C-5 Cercanías Madrid)
- Track gauge: 1,668 mm (5 ft 5 21/32 in) (Iberian gauge)

The Renfe Class 446 is a series of electric multiple units designed to provide effective commuter services in major urban centers in Spain.

== History ==
Planning began in the early 1980s and resulted in the prototype Class 445 when commuter services began to assume a major role in cities such as Madrid. The trains then operating these services, mainly Class 440 units, were becoming inadequate to cope with the volume of traffic. It was decided that to provide the required facilities for these service, with their short inter-station distances and high passenger volume, new trains would be needed, with greater acceleration at the cost of maximum speed. Due to the 2004 Madrid train bombings, three trains of this class were decommissioned. Two of the damaged sets were amalgamated to form a new train and the third set was repaired and returned to service.

== Design ==
Introduced in 1989, the 446 series was an innovative train design by Renfe. Each set having 2,400 kW (3,200 hp) of power, allowing a maximum acceleration of 1 m (3 ft 3 in) /s² with a top speed of 100 km/h (62 mph). The three car sets consist of two driving motor cars and an intermediate trailer, a new concept for Renfe. Each car has three pairs of double doors for quick entry and exit of travelers. One of the major drawbacks of these units, which earned them the nickname dodotis (a type of baby's nappy), is that originally they did not have toilets in the cars.

Class 446 sets were manufactured in 3 batches between July 1989 and December 1991, with small differences between them. The design finally evolved into the Renfe Class 447, very simillar on the outside but very different on a technical level (specially in the three-phase traction systems) although they can operate together with some limitations in traction and brake. Recent changes and enhancements included the addition of hustle alarms, both sound and indicator lights, for closing doors. Of the 170 units delivered, 25 have been withdrawn, including those affected by the 2004 Madrid train bombings. The units can be found operating suburban services (Cercanías) around Madrid, Seville, San Sebastián and Bilbao where the distances between stations is often 1–2 km (0.62–1.24 mi) or even less. Historically, they have also been used around Barcelona, Málaga, Santander and Valencia.

It is important to mention that the units assigned to Bilbao's lines C-1 and C-2 (known as BPT) have their retractable steps unused due to the different platform height in these lines compared with the rest of the spanish conventional rail network.

== Formation ==
Each set is made of 3 cars:

| Car No. | 1 | 2 | 3 |
|---|---|---|---|
| Designation | Motor | Trailer | Motor |
| Numbering (UIC) | 9-446-xxx (odd) | 7-446-xxx | 9-446-xxx (even) |
| Numbering (Other) | xxxM (odd) | xxxR | xxxM (even) |

=== Numbering example ===
The set no.1 is numbered as 001M-001R-002M (UIC numbering: 9-446-001+7-446-001+9-446-002), the second as 003M-002R-004M (9-446-003+7-446-002+9-446-004), and so on (M means powered and R trailer).

To talk about a specific unit it is common to use the trailer numeration (xxxR).

== Fleet details ==
The Class 446 sets are divided into the following groups:

| Batch | Unit nos. | City | Units out of service |
|---|---|---|---|
| 1st Batch (with LZB) | 446-001 to 446-008 | Madrid | --- |
| 1st Batch (without LZB) | 446-009 to 446-050 | Madrid Seville San Sebastián | 446-011*, 446-016, 446-018* and 446-042 |
| 2nd Batch | 446-051 to 446-100 | Madrid Seville San Sebastián Bilbao | 446-056, 446-057, 446-058, 446-067, 446-078 446-093 and 446-096* |
| 3rd Batch (with LZB) | 446-101 to 446-170 | Madrid | --- |

*Units involved in the 11M terrorist attacks on March 11th 2004.

== Liveries ==
Throughout almost 40 years in service these units have had the following paint schemes:

| Livery name | Photo | Other information |
|---|---|---|
| Prototype | --- | White base with details in grey, red and yellow. Only used during testing of the prototype (446-001) |
| Cercanías (Original) | --- | The original Cercanías livery (1987-2005) with the original Cercanías logo (1987-1992) before the 'C' was tilted to adapt for the co-official languages of Spain. |
| Cercanías (Tilted logo) | | Used between the introduction of the actual Cercanías logo and the separation of RENFE into ADIF and Renfe (1992 - 2005) |
| Semi-pantone | | Used as a transition between the Cercanías livery and the standardized Pantone livery of Renfe. (2005 - 2010) |
| Pantone | | The standardized livery for almost all Renfe trains from 2005 until the rebrand in 2026, adapted to Cercanías' signature red. (2005 - Present) |
| Morse | --- | The new Cercanías livery presented in October 2026 alongside the new Class 453 trains. As of October 31st 2026 the only unit with this scheme is 446-116. |
