= Palacio de Congresos railway station =

Train station in Seville, Spain

Palacio de Congresos

General information
- Location: Seville; Andalusia, Spain
- Coordinates: 37°24′13″N 5°56′11″W
- System: Cercanías station

Services
Preceding station	Cercanías Sevilla	Following station
Padre Pío clockwise loop	C-4	Santa Justa counter-clockwise loop
Preceding station	Seville Metro	Following station
Puerta Este towards Torre Triana	Line 2 (expected to open in 2017)	Ciencias towards Parque Tecnológico
Location

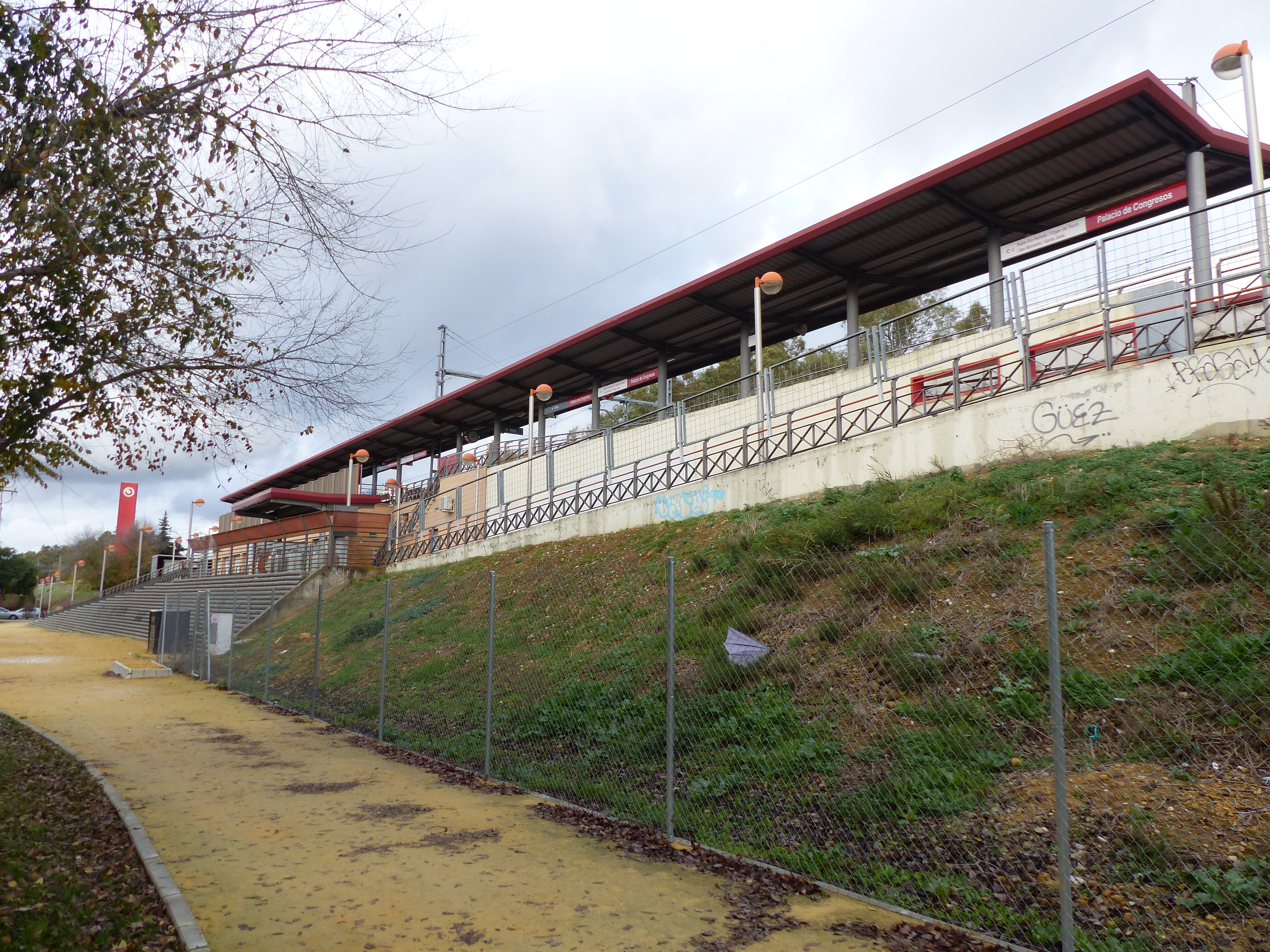

Palacio de Congresos (English: Congress Palace) is a station of C-4 line of the suburban trains (Spanish: Cercanías) in the city of Seville, Andalusia. It is located in the intersection of Ciencias and Luis Uruñuela avenues, in the neighborhood of Sevilla Este. Palacio de Congresos is an elevated building situated between the Padre Pío and Santa Justa on the same line.

== Metro (in planning phase) ==
In the current plans for the construction of Line 2 of the Seville Metro, Palacio de Congresos will be used as an interchange station between suburban trains and the Metro. However, there is currently no timetable for construction and Line 3 has taken priority as of 2024.

== See also ==
- List of Seville metro stations
