= Aeronaut (disambiguation) =

An aeronaut is a person who participates in aeronautics.

Aeronaut may also refer to:

- Aeronaut (company), an Estonian airline
- Aeronaut, a 2015 album by Parralox
- "Aeronaut", a song by Billy Corgan from the 2017 album Ogilala

== See also ==
- Aeronautica
- Aeronautics (album), a 2005 album by Masterplan
- The Aeronauts (disambiguation)
