= Palacio de Congresos =

Palacio de Congresos and may refer to places in Spain:

- Palacio de Congresos de Maspalomas, an indoor arena in Gran Canaria
- Palacio de Congresos railway station, a railway station in Seville
- Cádiz#Palacio de Congresos, a building in Cádiz
- Palacio de Congresos de Oviedo, a building in Oviedo
