= Cercanías =

Spanish commuter rail systems

Overview
- Owner: Renfe Operadora
- Transit type: Commuter rail

Operation
- Began operation: 1989 (creation of Renfe Cercanías division)

The commuter rail systems of Spain's major metropolitan areas are called Cercanías (Spanish: [θeɾkaˈni.as]) in most of Spain, Rodalia (Valencian: [roðaˈli.a]) in the Valencian Community, Aldiriak (Basque: [aldiɾiak]) in the Basque Country, Rodalies (Catalan: [ruðəˈli.əs]) in Catalonia and Proximidades (Galician: [pɾoksi.miˈðaðɪs]) in Galicia. There are fourteen Cercanías systems in and around the cities and regions of Asturias, Barcelona, Bilbao, Cádiz, Galicia, León, Madrid, Málaga, Murcia/Alicante, Cantabria, San Sebastián, Seville, Valencia and Zaragoza. They are linked to Metro systems in Madrid, Barcelona, Bilbao and Valencia.

The Cercanías division of Renfe was created in 1989 on the advice of engineer and transit planner Javier Bustinduy (es; 1949–2016), as part of a major effort to massively increase ridership, frequencies and hence attractiveness of commuter rail systems in Spain. Cercanías systems are gradually in the process of being transferred to the regional autonomous governments; the first such system to be transferred was the management of the former Cercanías Barcelona/Rodalia Barcelona to the Government of Catalonia and renaming to "Rodalies de Catalunya" (including all regionals) in 2010. The second, and last so far, was the transfer of both Basque systems, Bilbao and San Sebastián (and the right to declare a third in Álava) to the Basque Government in 2025. The Madrid Cercanías network was the target of the 2004 Madrid train bombings. The attacks, which killed 191 people in Santa Eugenia, El Pozo and Atocha stations, were the bloodiest terrorist actions in Spain to date.

== List of networks ==
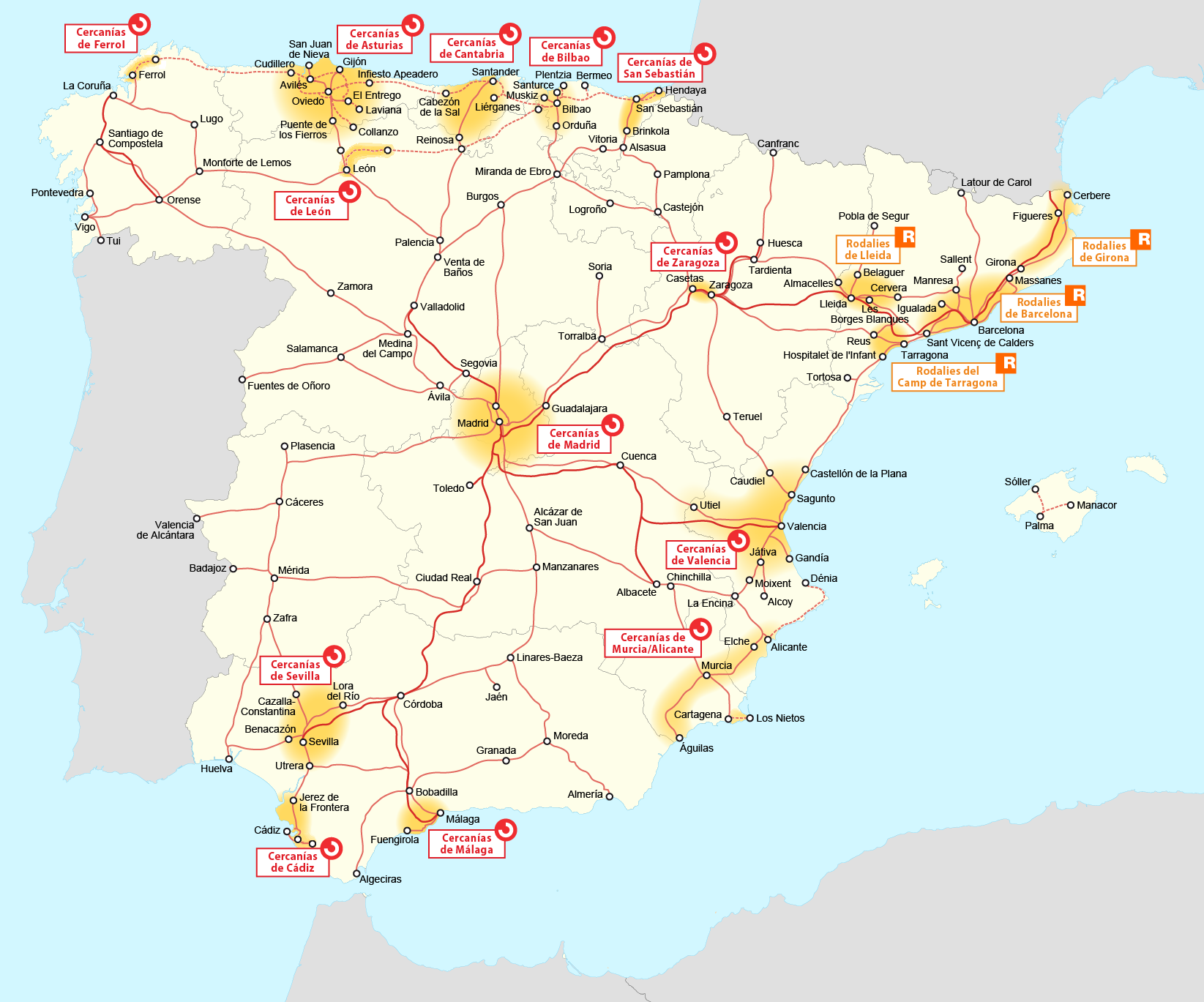
Map of Spain with all of the current Cercanías systems. The Rodalies de Catalunya system is also shown.

System Name	Major Cities Served	Annual patronage (2024)	Lines	Stations	Length (km)
Cercanías Madrid	Madrid	241,690,000	10	90	370
Rodalies de Catalunya	Barcelona	117,480,000	16	228	615
Cercanías Valencia	Valencia	20,980,000	6	66	252
Cercanías Málaga	Málaga	17,130,000	2	26	70
Cercanías Bilbao	Bilbao	14,610,000	4	63	100.5
Cercanías Asturias	Gijón, Oviedo, Avilés	8,370,000	9	143	383.2
Cercanías Sevilla	Seville	7,440,000	5	37	251
Cercanías Cádiz	Cádiz, Jerez de la Frontera	7,250,000	2	13	61
Cercanías San Sebastián	San Sebastián	5,280,000	1	30	80.5
Cercanías Cantabria	Santander	5,020,000	3	62	178
Cercanías Murcia/Alicante	Murcia, Alicante, Cartagena	3,150,000	4	41	222
Cercanías Zaragoza	Zaragoza	310,000	1	6	16.6
Cercanías León	León	129,000	1	44	98.3
Cercanías Galicia	Ferrol	26,500	1	24	52.2

== Rolling stock ==
The Cercanías services use the following rolling stock. In 2021, Renfe announced the purchase of 59 Stadler KISS trainsets to complement the fleet.

Series	Area	Image
433	Asturias	
435	Asturias	
436	Bilbao; Asturias	
438	Cantabria	
442	Madrid	
446	Bilbao; Madrid; Cantabria; Sevilla	
447	Catalonia; Valencia; Murcia/Alicante; San Sebastián; Cantabria; Córdoba	
450/451	Madrid; Barcelona	
Civia	Asturias; Cádiz; Madrid; Barcelona; Málaga; Sevilla; Valencia; Zaragoza; Cantabria	
526	Asturias León	
529	Galicia, Murcia/Alicante	
592	Murcia/Alicante Valencia	
