= Aeronautica =

Aeronautica may refer to:

- Aeronautica Militare, the air force of the Republic of Italy
- Italian Co-belligerent Air Force from 1943 until 1945 colloquially known as Aeronautica del Sud
- Special Administrative Unit of Civil Aeronautics, Colombian government agency also known as Aeronáutica Civil
- Aeronáutica Industrial S.A., a Spanish aeronautical company
- Aeronautica Macchi, the former name of Alenia Aermacchi
- Aeronáutica Agrícola Mexicana SA, a now defunct Mexican aircraft manufacturer
- Aeronáutica (Angola), an Angolan airline
- Aeronautica Imperialis, a tabletop miniature wargame
- Aeronáutica (Seville Metro)
