= Montesierra (Seville Metro) =

Metro station in Seville, Spain

General information
- Location: Montesierra Av., East, Seville; Andalusia, Spain
- Platforms: 1 Side platform, 65 m long, with platform screen doors
- Tracks: 2
- Connections: Bus: 27, B4

Construction
- Structure type: Ground
- Accessible: Yes

Other information
- Fare zone: 1

Montesierra is a station on the proposed line 2 of the Seville Metro. If completed, the station located within the Industrial park known as Polígono Industrial Carretera Amarilla, close to Montesierra Av. Currently, Seville has prioritized Line 3 for completion in advance of line 2 and thus the specific timeline for the completion of Line 2 is unclear.

== Future services ==
Preceding station	Seville Metro	Following station
Carretera Amarilla / Tesalónica towards Torre Triana	Line 2	Luis Uruñuela towards Parque Tecnológico

== See also ==
- List of Seville metro stations
