= Line 2 (Seville Metro) =

Metro line in Seville, Spain

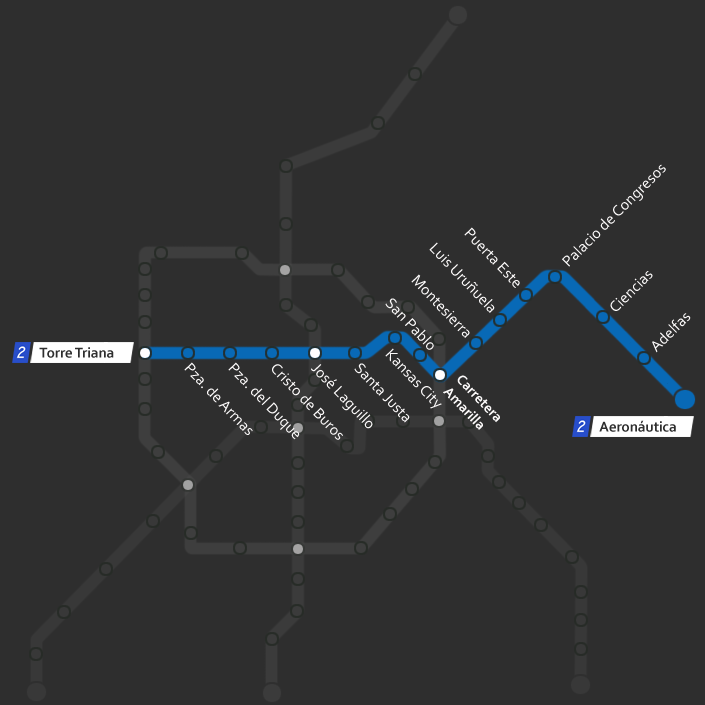

Overview
- Status: In planning phase
- Locale: Seville
- Stations: 18

Service
- Type: Rapid transit
- System: Seville Metro

History
- Opened: TBD

Technical
- Line length: 13.57 km
- Track gauge: 1,435 mm (4 ft 8 1/2 in)

The Line 2 of the Metro of Seville will span the city from east to west, connecting the neighbourhoods of La Cartuja and Torreblanca.

== Description ==
Line 2 is still in the planning phase. Through a tunnel, it will travel the city from east to west. The line will begin in the neighbourhood of Torreblanca and will proceed to pass through Sevilla Este and el Palacio de Congresos, Montesierra, Tesalónica (with a line 4 connection expected), Kansas City, the central station of Santa Justa, José Laguillo (a planned line 3 station), la Plaza del Duque, the Plaza de Armas bus station, before finally crossing the river to Torre Triana (a planned line 4 station). The line will not have a direct transfer with line 1.

This line is of vital importance in terms of the trajectory that it spans, especially since it passes beneath the historic centre of the city and connects the international bus station of Plaza de Armas with the central railroad station of Santa Justa. Consequently, it has been though necessary to advance the modernization of the existing metro and railway installations, thereby providing a direct connection between the international bus station and the high velocity train (AVE) station of Santa Justa. It is estimated that the depth of the central segment will be more than 50 metres.

As of 2024, the line has been on hold since at least 2017 due to lack of funding. Currently, Seville is seeking EU funds in order to kick start the project - with an intended start date of 2028. Additionally, current plans include an extension of the originally proposed project which would include five extra stations within the median of highway A-49. These stations would be: Camas, Airesur (commercial center), Nueva Sevilla, Bormujos-Gines and Hospital de San Juan de Dios (Bormujos).

== General characteristics expected ==
- Method of construction: Tunnel boring machine, cut and cover, and surface.
  - Underground: 9,650 m
  - Street level: 3,920 m
  - Average depth: 25 m
- Estimated cost: Between €1,032,000 and €1,233,000.
- Municipalities served: One
- Districts spanned: Five
- Population served:
- Annual users: Approximately 19,600,000
- Daily users: Approximately 65,376

== Stations ==
Line
	Torre Triana
	Plaza de Armas
	Plaza del Duque
	Cristo de Burgos
	María Auxiliadora
	Santa Justa
	Kansas City
	San Pablo
^{†}	Carretera Amarilla
	Montesierra
	Luis Uruñuela
	Puerta Este
	Palacio de Congresos
	Ciencias
	Adelfas
	Aeronáutica
	Dr Miguel Rios
* Line in planning phase. † Out-of-system transfer planned.
