= Renfe Class 592 =

Spanish diesel multiple unit train type

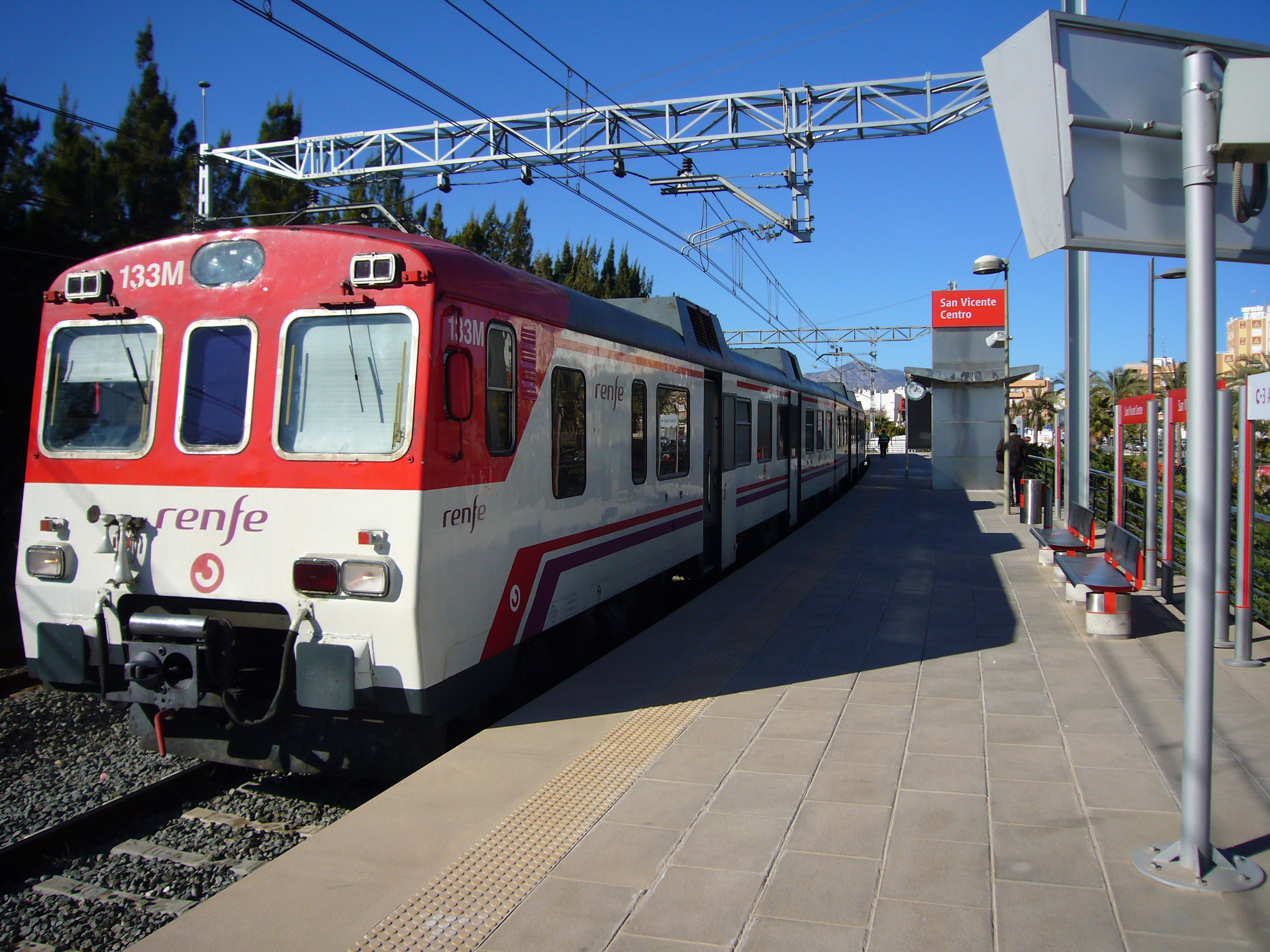
- Series 592 DMU with the Cercanías livery at San Vicente Centro, Alicante

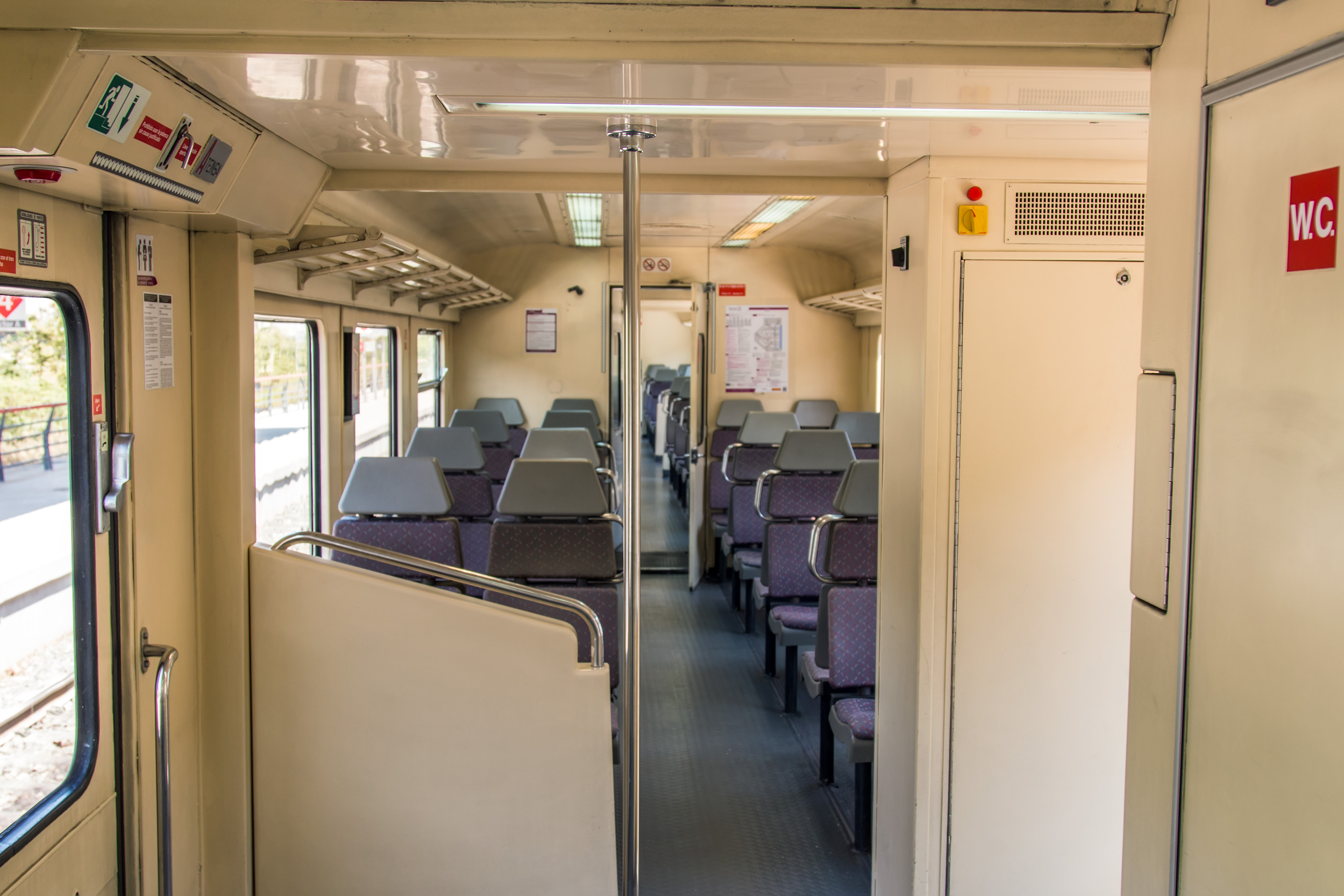
- The interior of a 592 train
- In service: 1981–present
- Manufacturer: Macosa, Ateinsa
- Constructed: 1981–1984
- Entered service: 1981
- Number built: 70
- Number in service: 68
- Formation: 3-car trainsets
- Capacity: 228/200 seated
- Operators: Renfe; Comboios de Portugal

Specifications
- Car length: 23,080 mm (75 ft 8.66 in) (motor); 22,620 mm (74 ft 2.55 in) (trailer)
- Width: 2,860 mm (9 ft 4.60 in)
- Height: 3,965 mm (13 ft 0.10 in)
- Doors: 6 per car
- Maximum speed: 140 km/h (87 mph)
- Weight: 130.4 t (128.3 long tons; 143.7 short tons)
- Traction system: Diesel
- Prime mover(s): MAN BTXUE 3256; MAN D2866 LUE 601
- Traction motors: 4
- Power output: 840 kW or 1,126.5 hp
- Transmission: Hydraulic
- Auxiliaries: 140 kVA
- Braking system(s): Pneumatic / Electropneumatic (592.2)
- Coupling system: Scharfenberg
- Track gauge: 1,668 mm (5 ft 5 21/32 in) (Iberian gauge)

Renfe Class 592 is a class of diesel multiple unit trains built by Macosa and Ateinsa for some Renfe Cercanías commuter railway networks in Spain, as well as various regional services in Spain and Portugal. The first units entered service in 1981. The class 592 was created with passenger comfort and build quality in mind, and to meet the goals of reliability, frequency and punctuality.

== Services ==
=== Cities and routes ===
Class 592 units operate in the following cities:

- Murcia/Alicante
- Valencia

=== Other services ===
Class 592 units also operate in various regional rail services around Spain and parts of Portugal

== Accidents and incidents ==
- On 9 September 2016, a class 592.0 unit was derailed at O Porriño. Four people were killed and 49 injured, seven seriously.

== Gallery ==
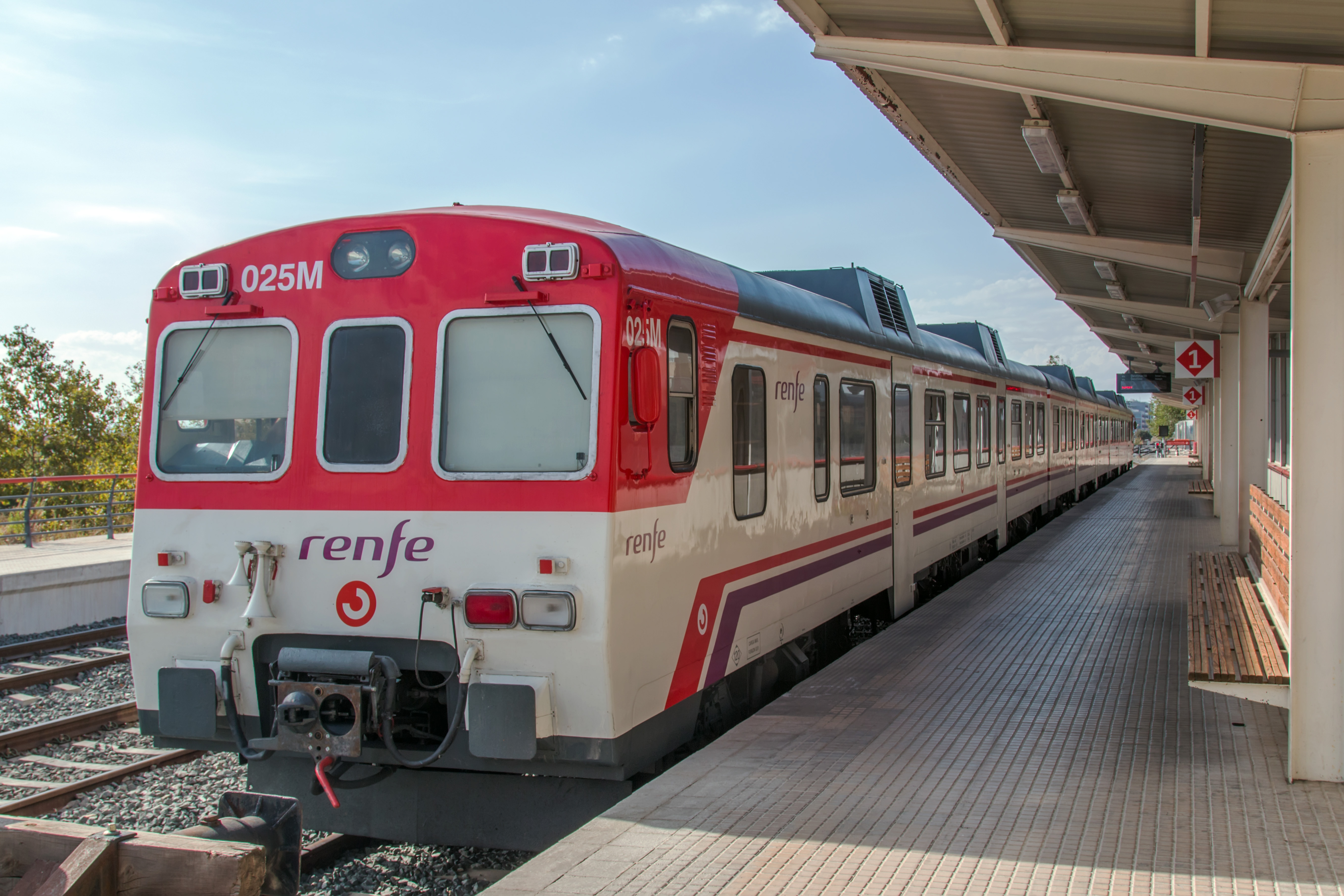
A 592 DMU with the Cercanías livery at Valencia-Sant Isidre

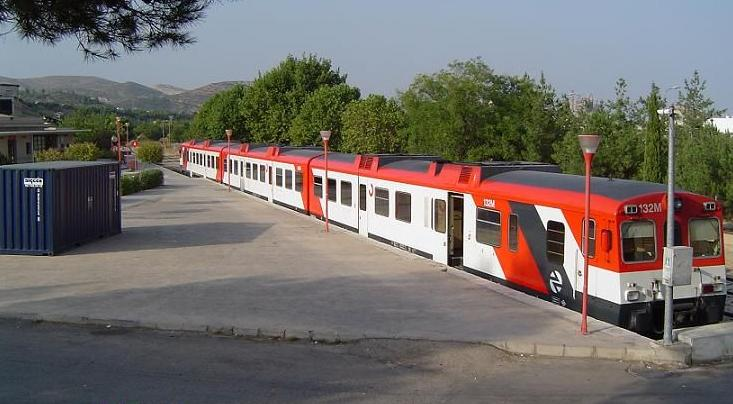
A 592 DMU on its original livery at Buñol, Valencian Community

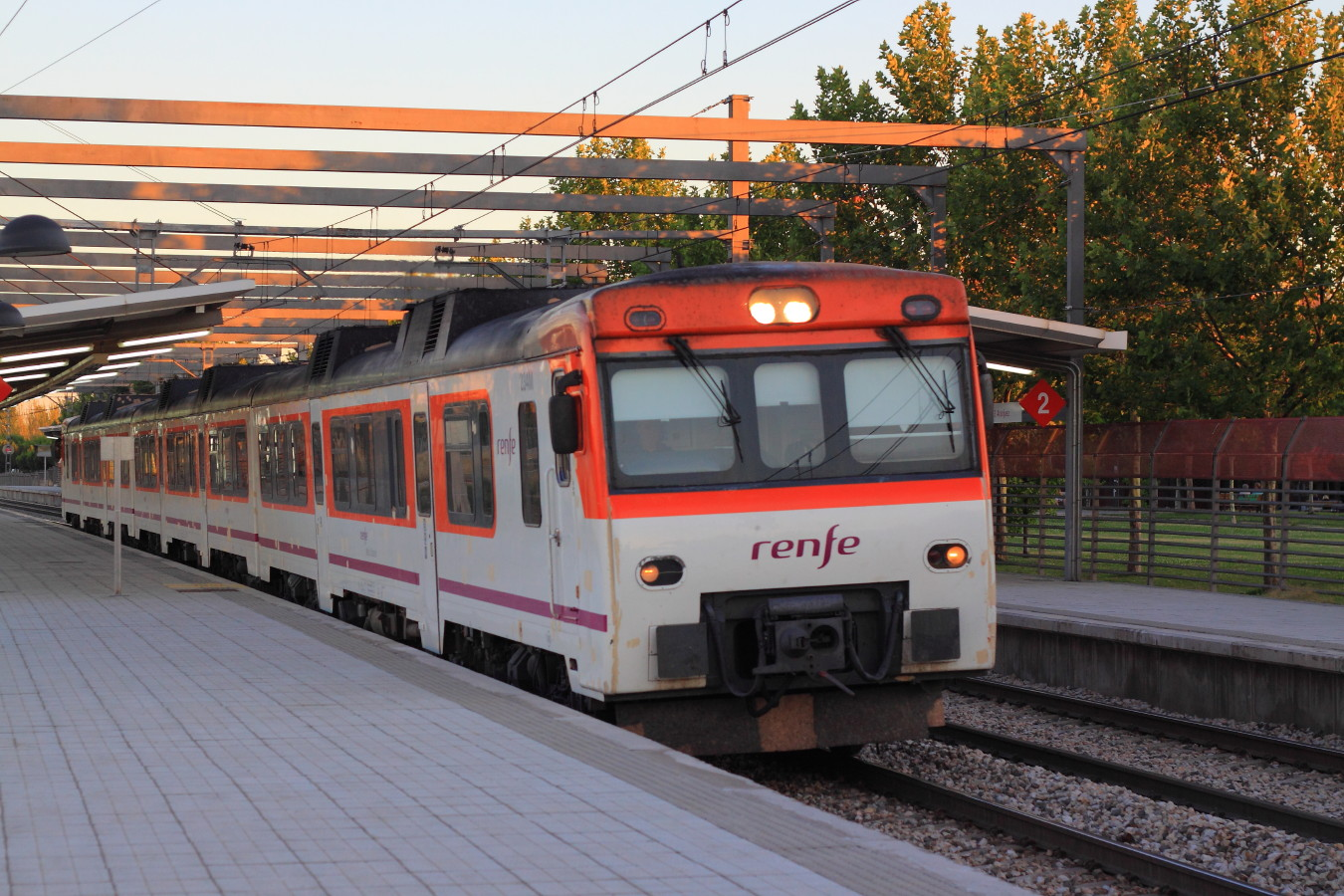
A 592 DMU with the Regionales livery in El Casar, Getafe near Madrid

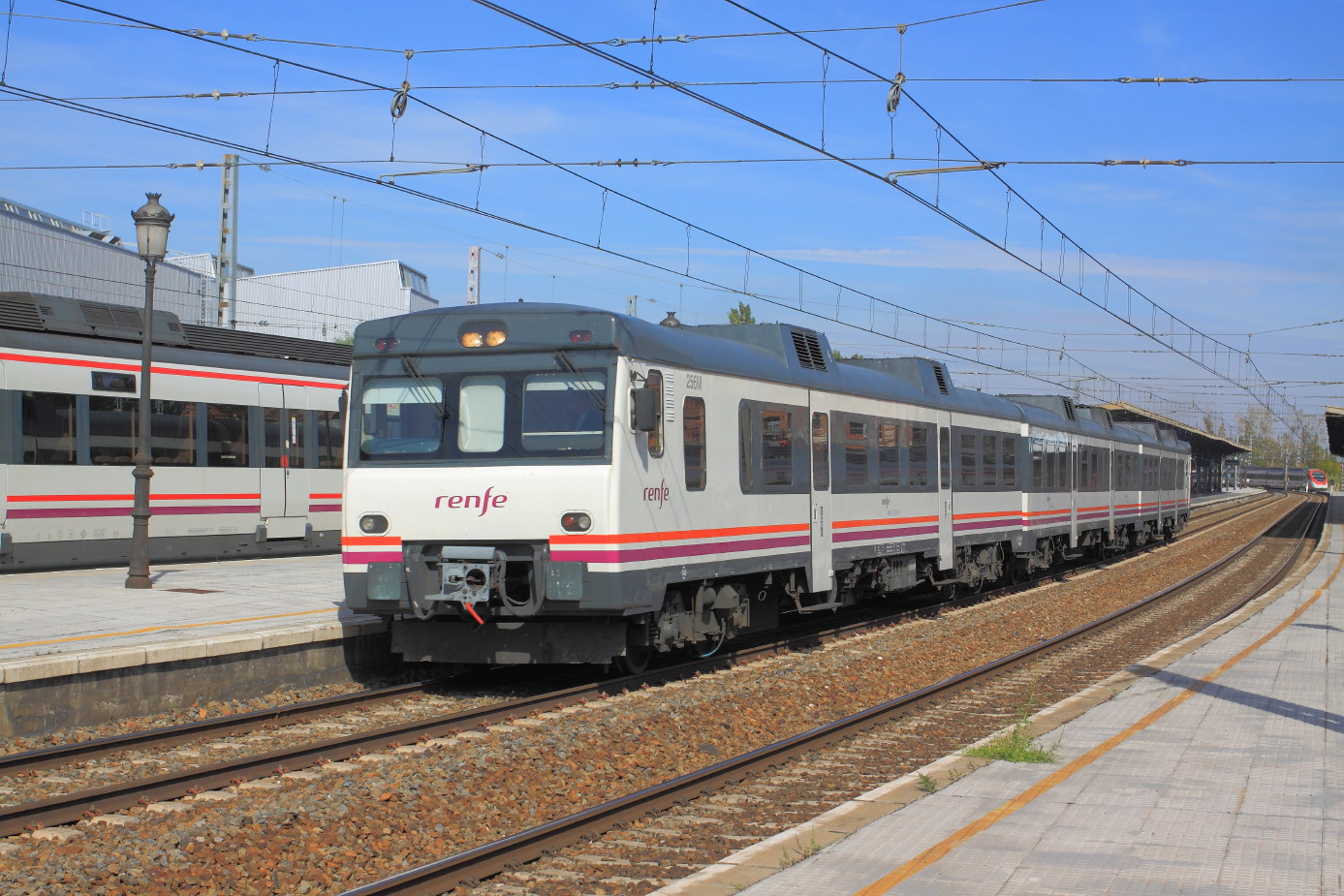
A 592 DMU with the Media Distancia livery at Aranjuez, outside Madrid

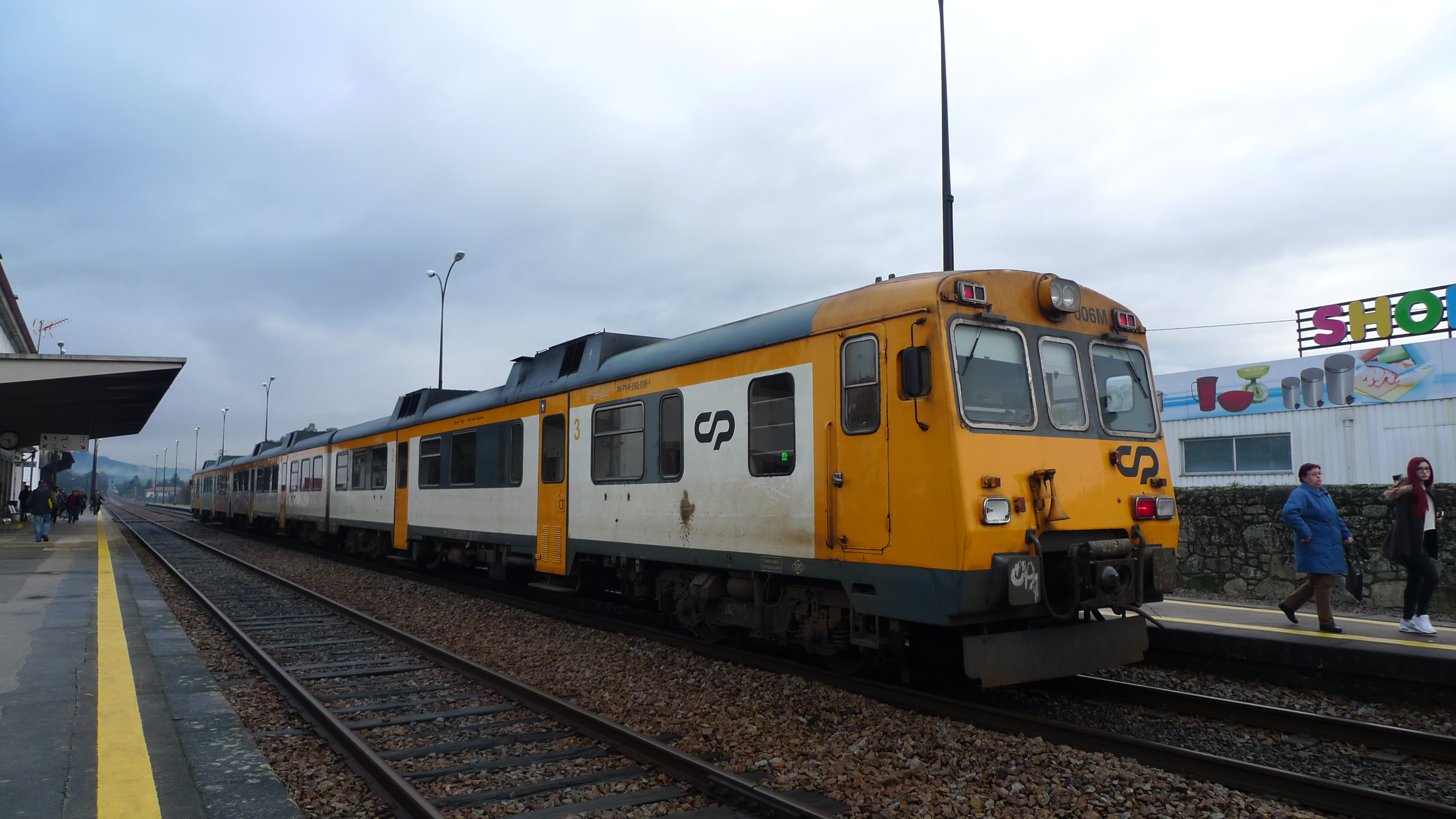
A 592 DMU with the CP livery at Barcelos, Portugal

== See also ==
- Renfe
- Cercanías
