= Ciencias (Seville Metro) =

Metro station in Seville, Spain

General information
- Location: Ciencias Av., East, Seville; Andalusia, Spain
- Platforms: 1 Side platform, 65 m long, with platform screen doors
- Tracks: 2
- Connections: Bus: 27, B4

Construction
- Structure type: Underground
- Depth: 9.7 m (32 ft)
- Accessible: Yes

Other information
- Fare zone: 1

Ciencias (English: Sciences) is a proposed station on line 2 of the Seville Metro. If plans for Line 2 are green lit, the station will be located at the intersection of Ciencias Av. and Emilio Lemos St., in the neighborhood of Seville Este. Ciencias will be an underground building situated between the stations of Palacio de Congresos Currently, Seville has prioritized Line 3 for completion in advance of line 2 and thus the specific timeline for the completion of Line 2 is unclear.

== Future services ==
Preceding station	Seville Metro	Following station
Palacio de Congresos towards Torre Triana	Line 2	Adelfas towards Parque Tecnológico

== See also ==
- List of Seville metro stations
