= Adelfas (Seville Metro) =

Metro station in Seville, Spain

General information
- Location: Ciencias Av., East, Seville; Andalusia, Spain
- Platforms: 1 Side platform, 65 m long, with platform screen doors
- Tracks: 2
- Connections: Bus: 27, B4

Construction
- Structure type: Underground
- Depth: 7.7 m (25 ft)
- Accessible: Yes

Other information
- Fare zone: 1

Adelfas (English: Oleanders) is a proposed station on line 2 of the Seville Metro. If plans for Line 2 are green lit, the station will be located in the intersection of Ciencias Av. and Adelfas St., in the neighborhood of Seville Este. Adelfas will be an underground building situated between the stations of Ciencias and Aeronáutica on the same line. Currently, Seville has prioritized Line 3 for completion in advance of line 2 and thus the specific timeline for the completion of Line 2 is unclear.

== Future services ==
Preceding station	Seville Metro	Following station
Ciencias towards Torre Triana	Line 2	Aeronáutica towards Parque Tecnológico

== See also ==
- List of Seville metro stations
