= Renfe Class 447 =

Electric multiple unit train type

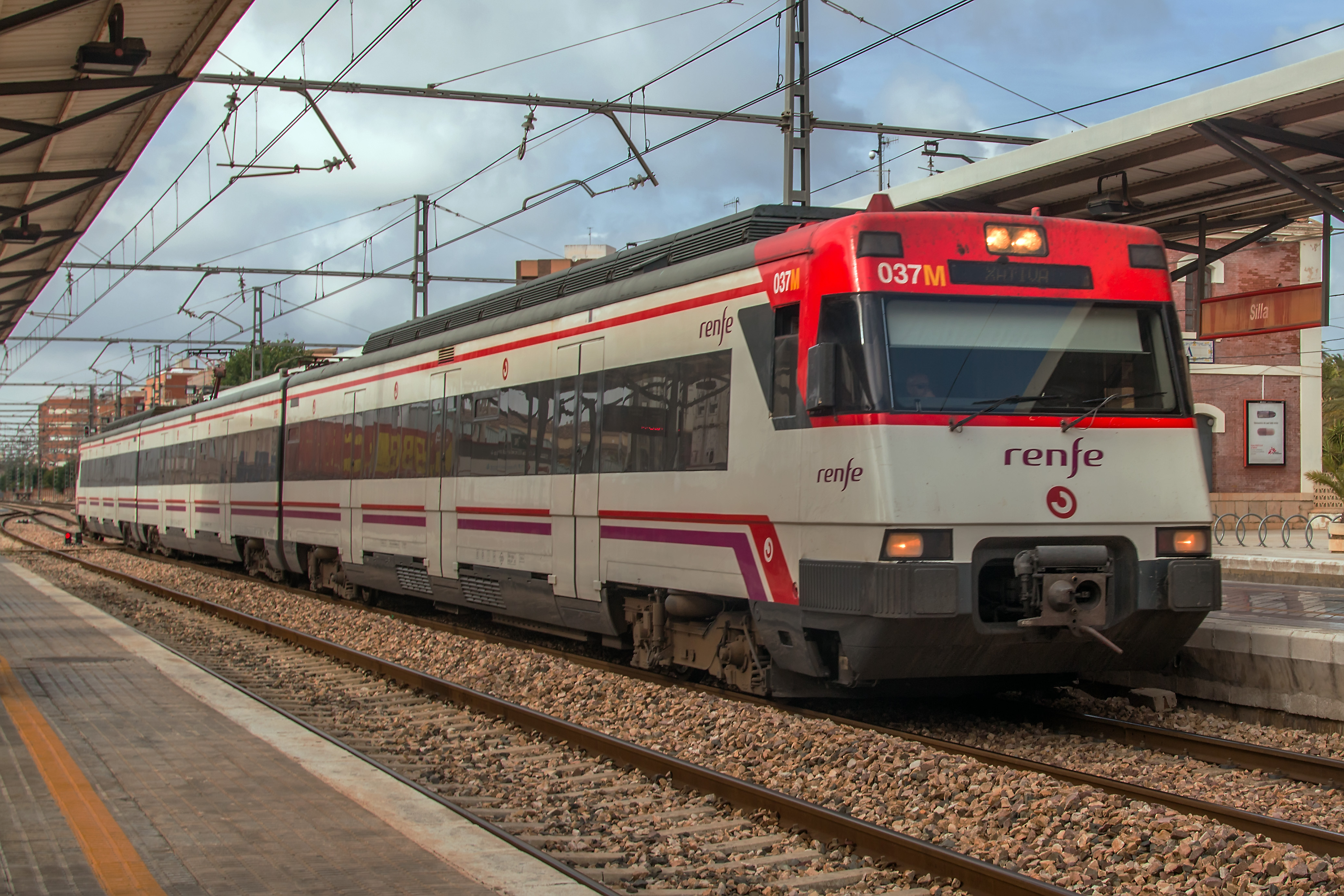
- Renfe Class 447 EMU at Silla (Valencia) station

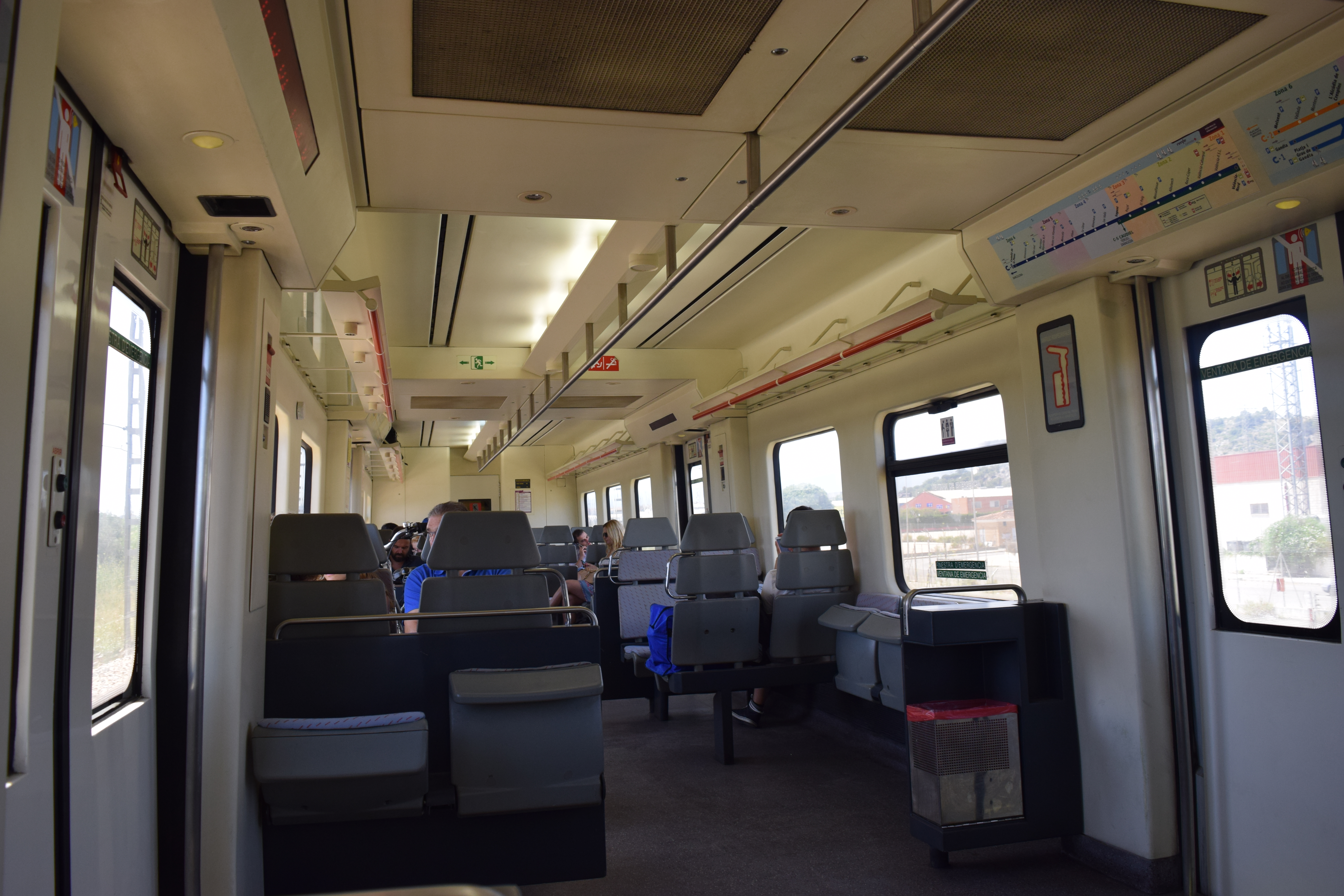
- The interior of a Cercanías Valencia Renfe Class 447
- Stock type: Electric multiple unit
- Manufacturers: CAF, Alstom, Siemens, ABB, Adtranz
- Constructed: 1992–2001
- Entered service: 1993
- Number built: 183
- Predecessor: Renfe Class 446, Renfe Class 445
- Capacity: 702 (234 seated)
- Operator: Renfe

Specifications
- Train length: 75,993 millimetres (2,991.9 in)
- Width: 2,900 millimetres (110 in)
- Height: 4,185 millimetres (164.8 in)
- Doors: 6 per car
- Maximum speed: 120 km/h (74.56 mph)
- Weight: 157 t (154.5 long tons; 173.1 short tons)
- Prime movers: 4 engines per railcar, Siemens 1TB2220-0JA03 three-phase induction 320kW engine
- Power output: 2,400 kW or 3,218.5 hp
- Power supply: Pantograph
- Electric system: 3 kV DC catenary
- AAR wheel arrangement: Bo′Bo′+2′2′+Bo′Bo′
- Safety system: ASFA
- Track gauge: 1,668 mm (5 ft 5 21/32 in) (Iberian gauge), suitable for standard gauge 1,435 mm (4 ft 8 1/2 in)

The Renfe Class 447 is a class of electric multiple unit trains built by CAF, Alstom, Siemens, ABB, and Adtranz for Renfe Cercanías, Spain's commuter railway networks. The first units entered service in 1993.

== History ==
In the early 1980s, Cercanías services started gaining importance in cities like Madrid and existing units, essentially Renfe Class 440, began to become insufficient. For this reason, the design of a new train model began its development. This was materialized in a prototype, Renfe Class 445, built in 1984 and tested in Madrid and Barcelona's networks until year 1990. After this, Renfe Class 446 and 447 started their manufacture process in 1989 and 1992 respectively, the second of which added some improvements to the original model. The only visually perceivable difference between 446 and 447 is that, in the first, letters "R" and "M" in the numbering system are displayed red and white respectively, while in 447, they're both yellow. This numbering is found in the top left corner of the front of the motor units, and on the sides of the Remolque units.

== Technical details ==
Class 447 units use 3 kV DC overhead catenary line electric traction. The maximum speed of Class 447 units in service is 120 km/h. Both speed and acceleration were improved from its predecessor, Class 446. Due to the difference in performance between 447 and its counterpart, the older model is set for lines where the distance between stations is shorter (1–2 km), given its reduced maximum speed (100 km/h instead of 447's 120 km/h) didn't affect the time between stations.

== Incidents and accidents ==
On 20 January 2026, a Class 447 train collided with a fallen containment wall, killing the driver and injuring 41 others in Gelida, near Barcelona

== Cities and routes ==
Class 447 units operate on the following networks:

- Cercanías Murcia/Alicante
- Rodalies de Catalunya
- Cercanías Valencia
- Cercanías San Sebastián
- Cercanías Cantabria
- Rodalia de Girona (Rodalies de Catalunya)
- Rodalia del Camp de Tarragona (Rodalies de Catalunya)
- Regional services in Catalunya
- Cercanías Madrid (until 2018)

== Gallery ==
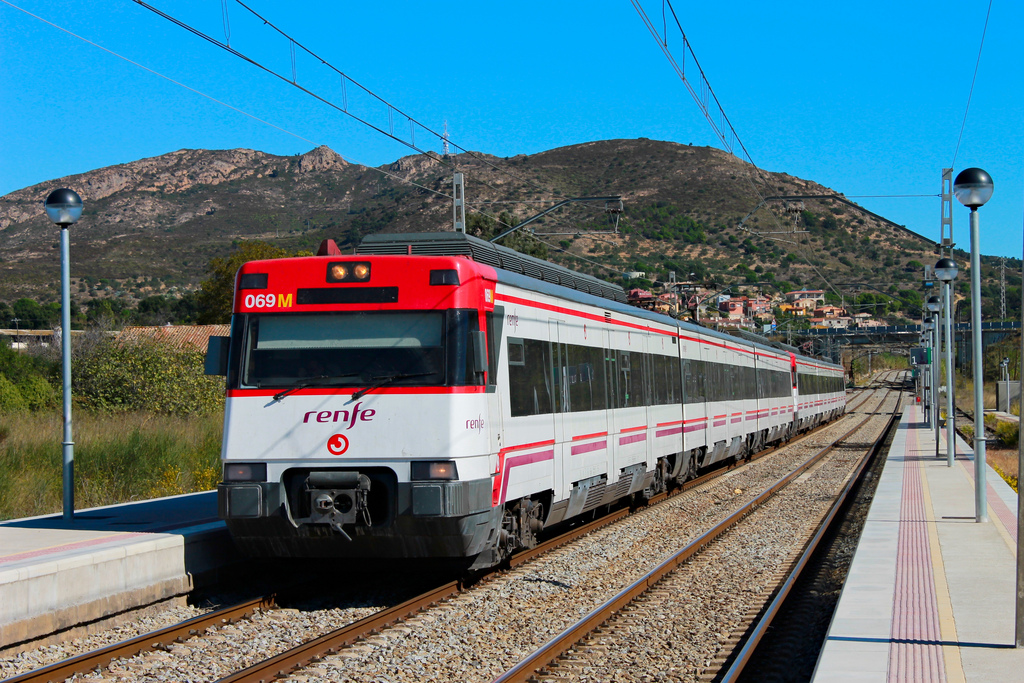
Renfe Class 447 at Vilajuïga station, in the Barcelona-Portbou/Cerbère Rodalies de Catalunya line.

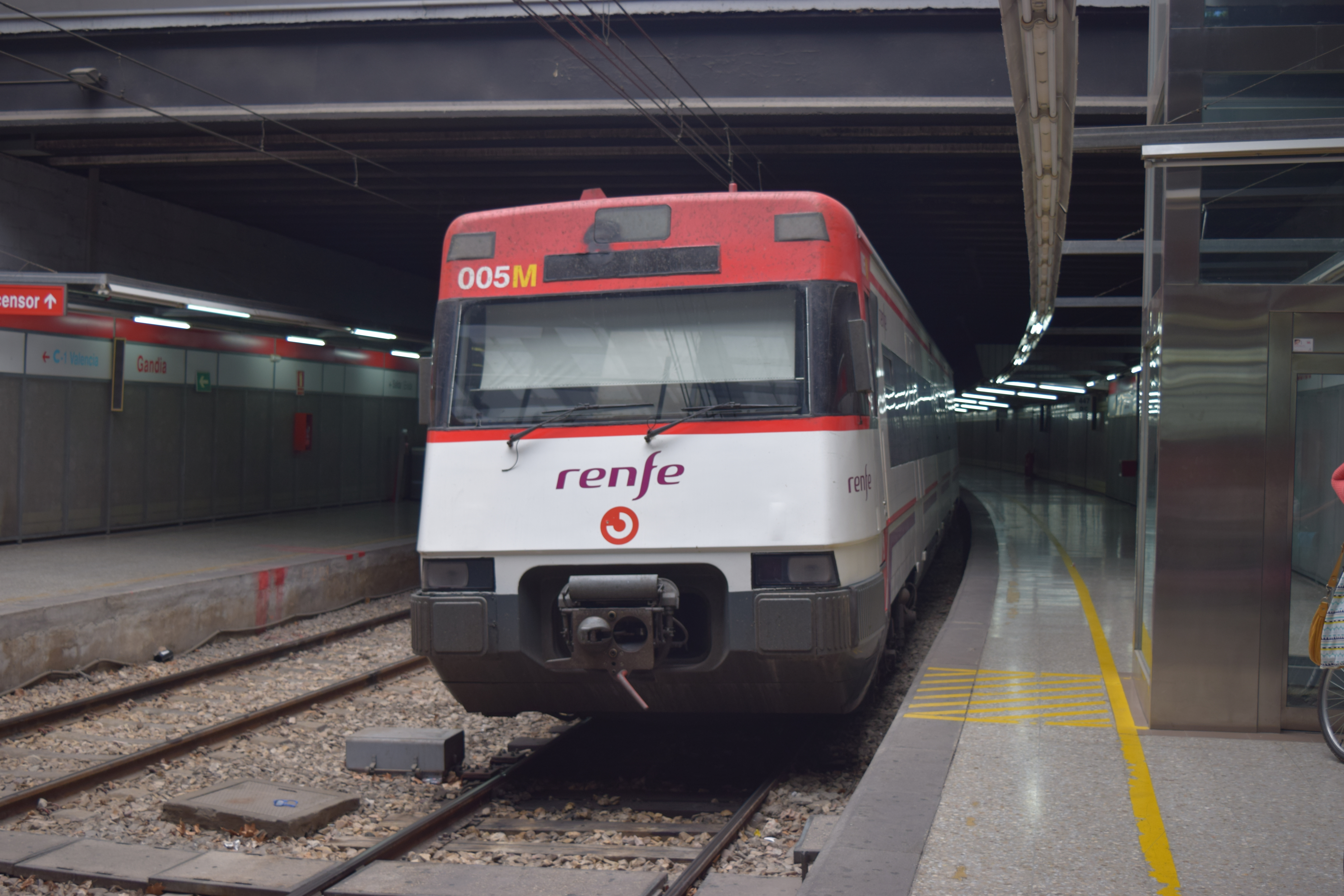
Renfe Class 447 at Gandía station, Valencia.

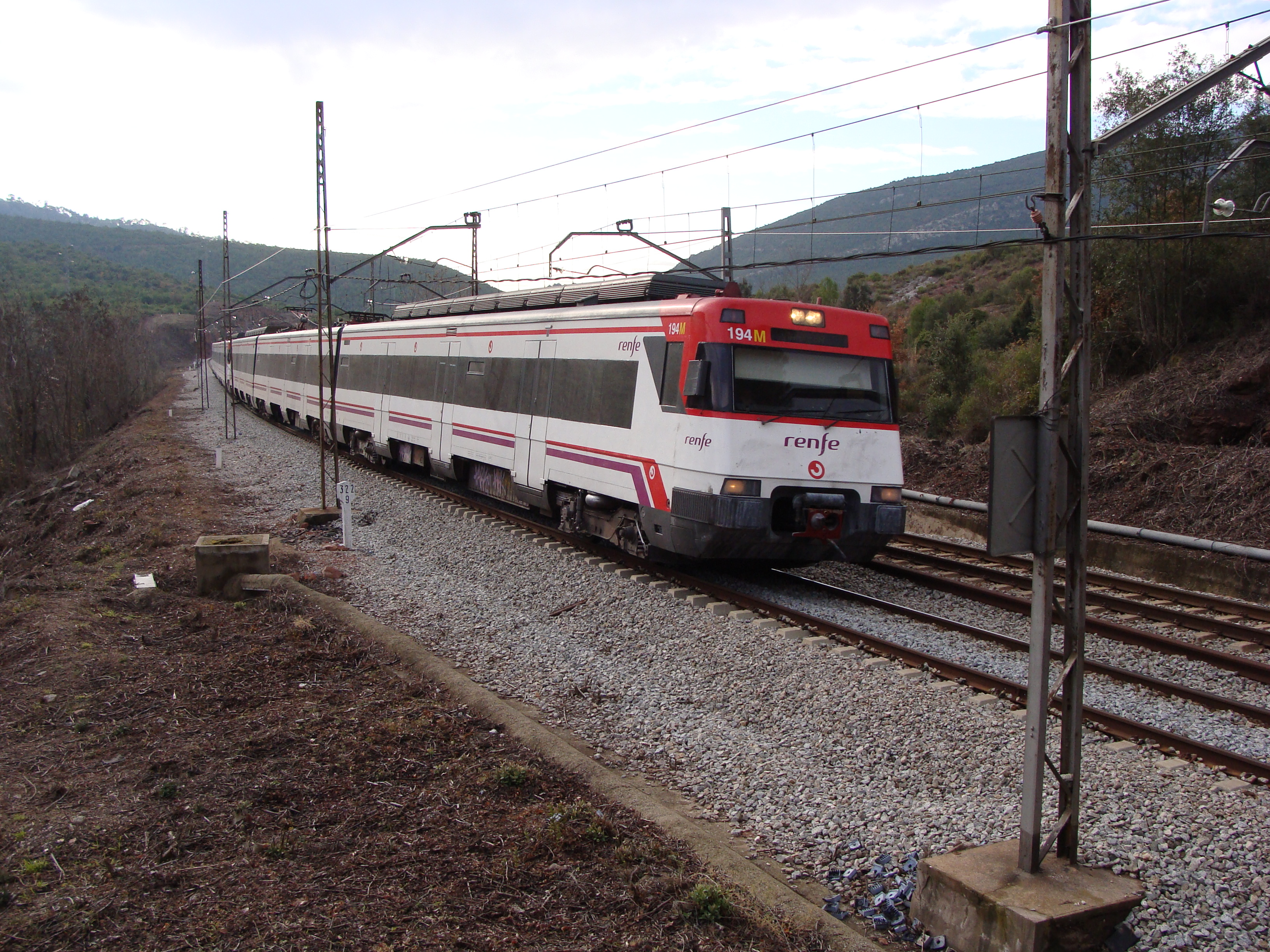
Renfe Class 447 in Vacarisses, Barcelona in Catalonia.

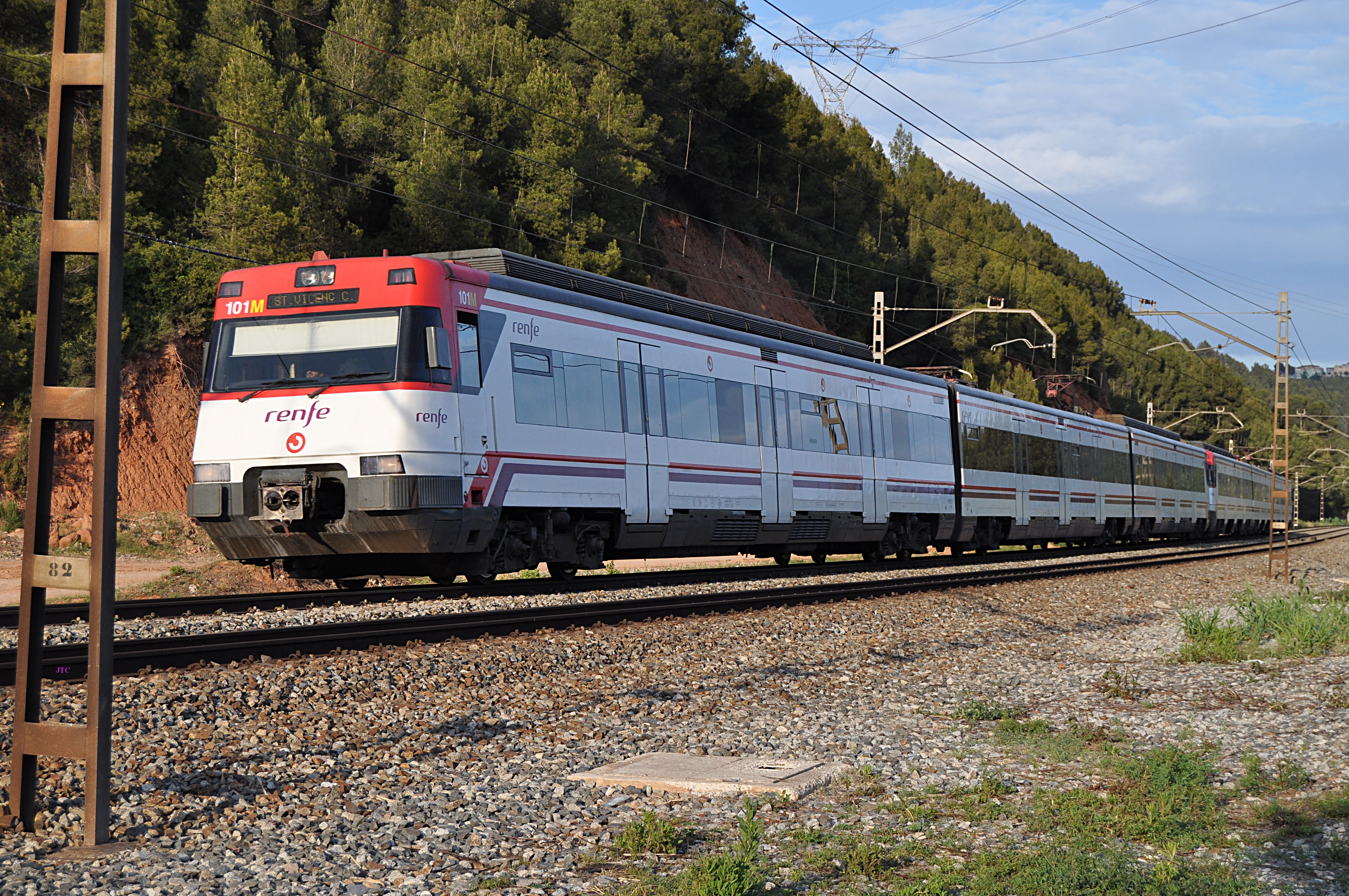
Renfe Class 447 double-unit operating for Rodalies de Catalunya, at Castellbisbal.

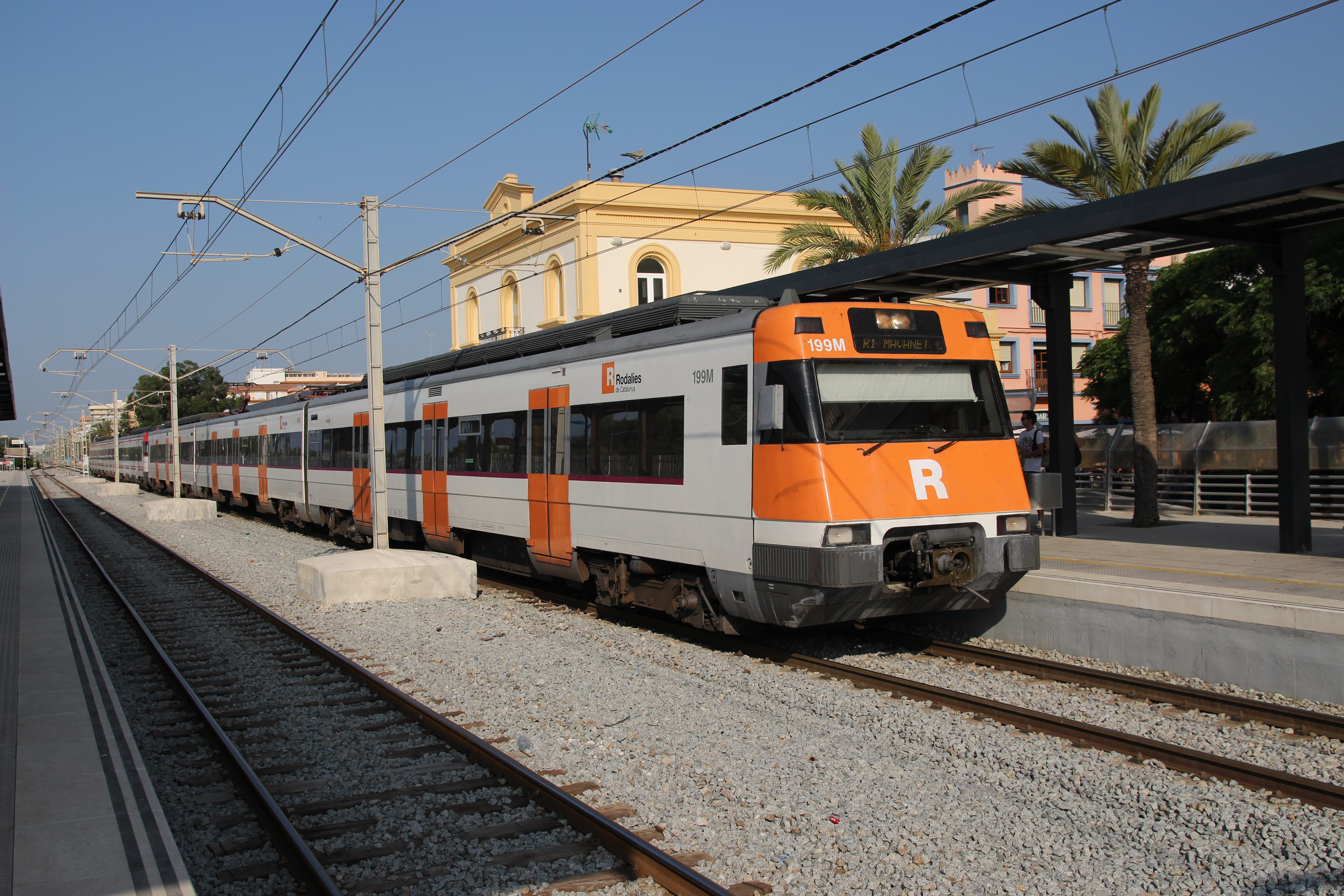
Renfe Class 447 operated by Rodalies de Catalunya.

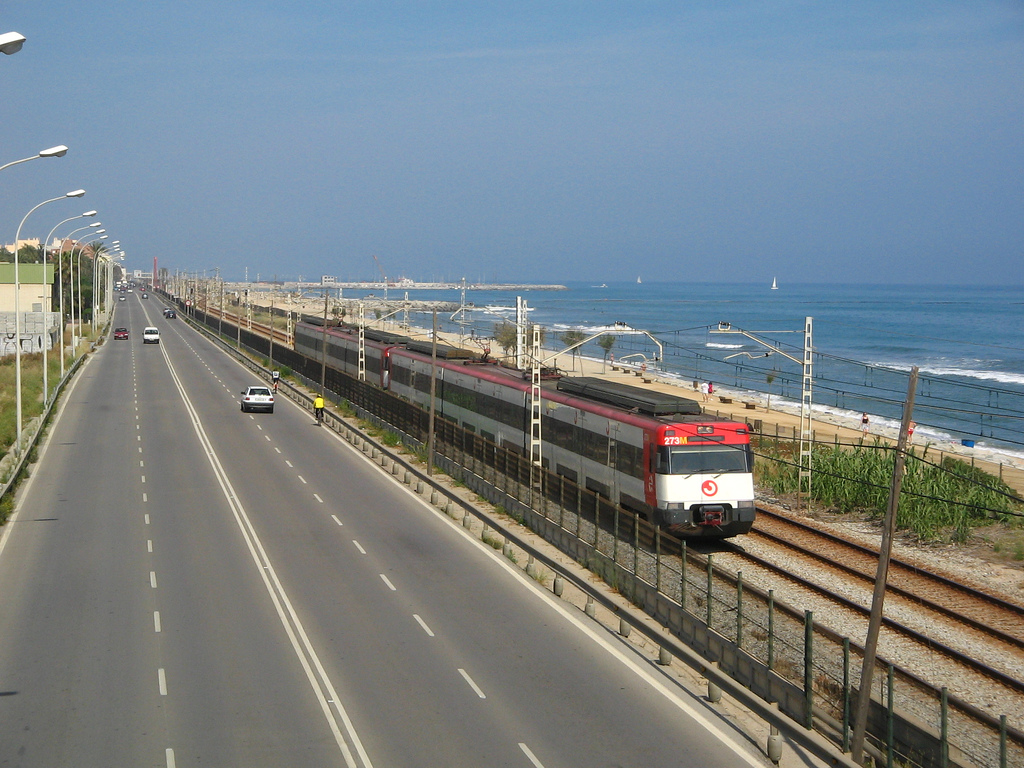
Renfe Class 447 by the Spanish coast.

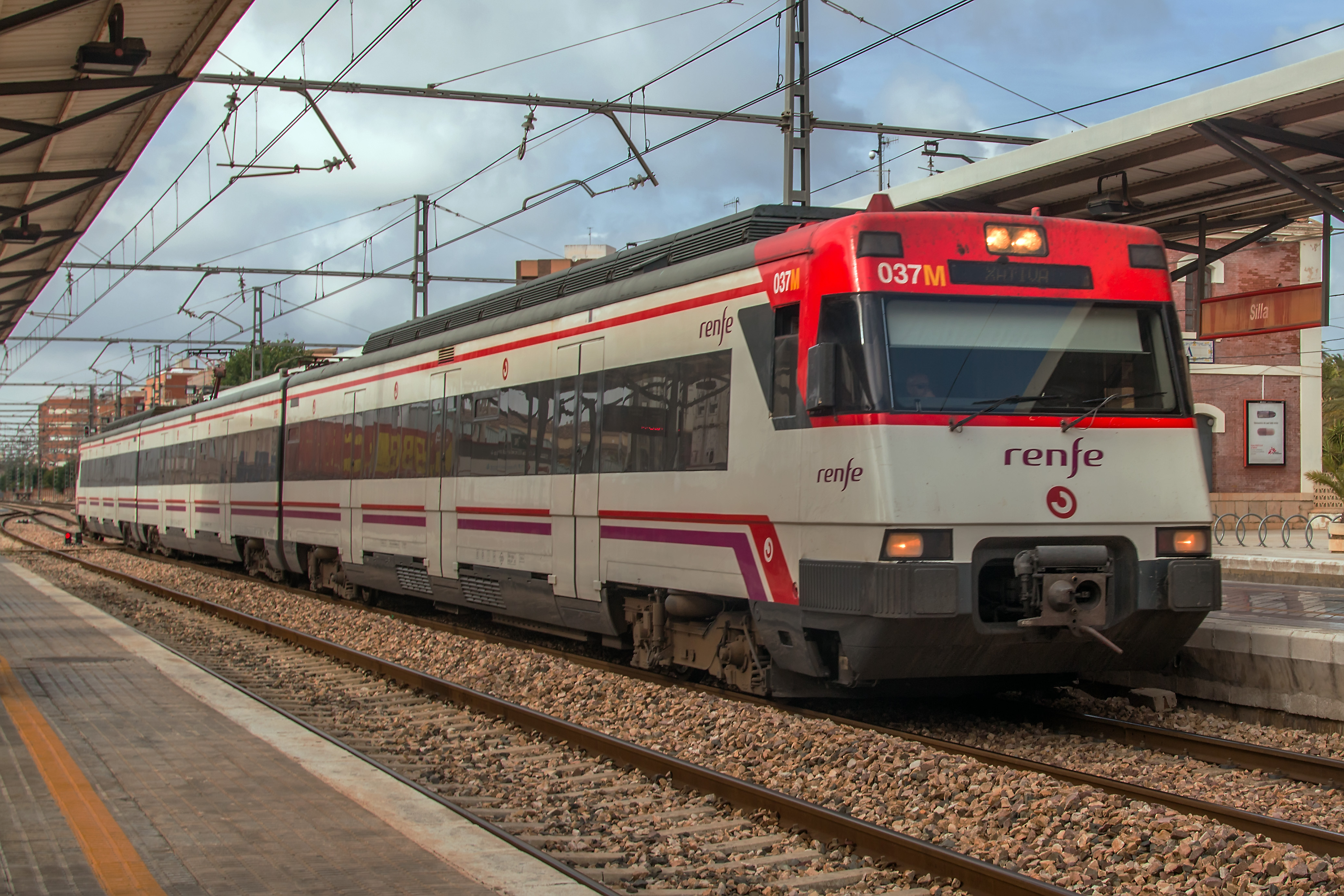
Renfe Class 447 in Silla, Valencia.

== See also ==
- Renfe Class 446
- Renfe
- Cercanías
- Rodalies de Catalunya
