= Puerta Este (Seville Metro) =

Metro station in Seville, Spain

General information
- Location: Luis Uruñuela Av., East, Seville; Andalusia, Spain
- Platforms: 1 Side platform, 65 m long, with platform screen doors
- Tracks: 2
- Connections: Bus: 27, B4

Construction
- Structure type: Underground
- Depth: 9.7 m (32 ft)
- Accessible: Yes

Other information
- Fare zone: 1

Puerta Este (English: East Gate) is a proposed station on line 2 of the Seville Metro. If plans for Line 2 are green lit, the station will be located in the intersection of Luis Uruñuela and Luis Bejarano St., in the neighborhood of Seville Este. Puerta Este will be an underground station and will be situated between Luis Uruñuela and Palacio de Congresos on the same line. Currently, Seville has prioritized Line 3 for completion in advance of line 2 and thus the specific timeline for the completion of Line 2 is unclear.

== Future services ==
Preceding station	Seville Metro	Following station
Luis Uruñuela towards Torre Triana	Line 2	Palacio de Congresos towards Parque Tecnológico

== See also ==
- List of Seville metro stations
