= The Aeronauts =

The Aeronauts may refer to:

- The Aeronauts (TV series), a French TV series
- The Aeronauts (film), a 2019 film

== See also ==
- Aeronaut (disambiguation)
