= Aeronáutica (Seville Metro) =

Metro station in Seville, Spain

General information
- Location: Ciencias Av., East, Seville; Andalusia, Spain
- Platforms: 1 Side platform, 65 m long, with platform screen doors
- Tracks: 2
- Connections: Bus: 27, B4

Construction
- Structure type: Underground
- Depth: 6.5 m (21 ft)
- Accessible: Yes

Other information
- Fare zone: 1

Aeronáutica (English: Aeronautics) is a proposed station on line 2 of the Seville Metro. According to proposed plans for Line 2, the station will be located in the intersection of Ciencias Av. and Aeronáutica Av., in the neighborhood of Seville Este. Aeuronáutica will be an underground construction and the provisional end point station of line 2 to be constructed by 2017. It will be situated before Adelfas on the same line. Currently, Seville has prioritized Line 3 for completion in advance of line 2 and thus the specific timeline for the completion of Line 2 is unclear.

== Future services ==
Preceding station	Seville Metro	Following station
Adelfas towards Torre Triana	Line 2	Polígono El Pino towards Parque Tecnológico

== See also ==
- List of Seville metro stations
