= Cercanías Valencia =

Commuter rail service in Valencia, Spain

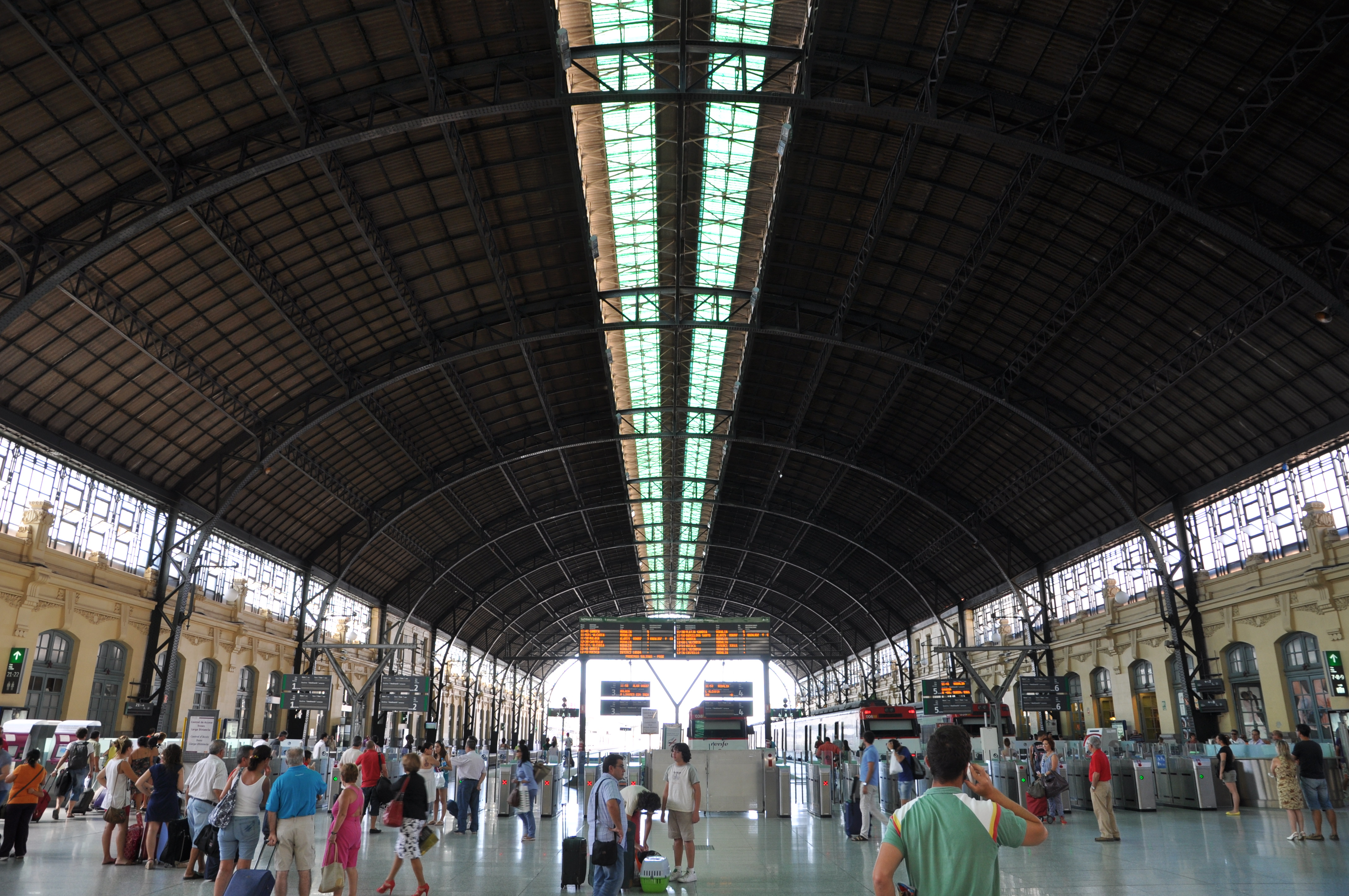
- València Nord station

Overview
- Owner: Renfe
- Locale: Valencia
- Transit type: Commuter rail
- Number of lines: 6
- Number of stations: 66
- Annual ridership: 15,860,000 (2017)

Operation
- Operator: Cercanías

Technical
- System length: 252 km (157 mi)

Cercanías Valencia (Valencian: Rodalia de València) is the commuter rail service that serves Valencia and its metropolis, Spain. It is operated by Cercanías Renfe, the commuter rail division of Renfe, the former monopoly of rail services in Spain. The network is owned by Adif, the national railway infrastructure company.

The Cercanías Valencia network includes six lines, 252 kilometres (157 mi) of track and 66 stations.

== Network and stations ==
The system has six radial lines to and from the city centre. Each line is colour-coded on maps and timetables.

Line	Route	Length (km)
	València-Nord - Gandia / Platja i Grau de Gandia	62
	València-Nord - Xàtiva - Moixent	80
	València-Nord - Buñol - Utiel	84
	València-Sant Isidre - Xirivella-l'Alter	2
	València-Nord-Sagunt-Caudiel	72
	València-Nord - Castelló de la Plana	70

Stations are in six concentric zones numbered 1–6. Zone 1 covers the city centre and Zone 6 includes the stations at the end of each line except C-4 which ends in Zone 1. The system's main interchange stations are at Valencia Nord, Sagunt and Silla.

Lines C-1, C-2, C-3, C-5 and C-6 terminate at Valencia Nord; line C-4 terminates at Valencia Sant Isidre. MetroValencia lines 1 and 5 connect the Nord and Sant Isidre stations.

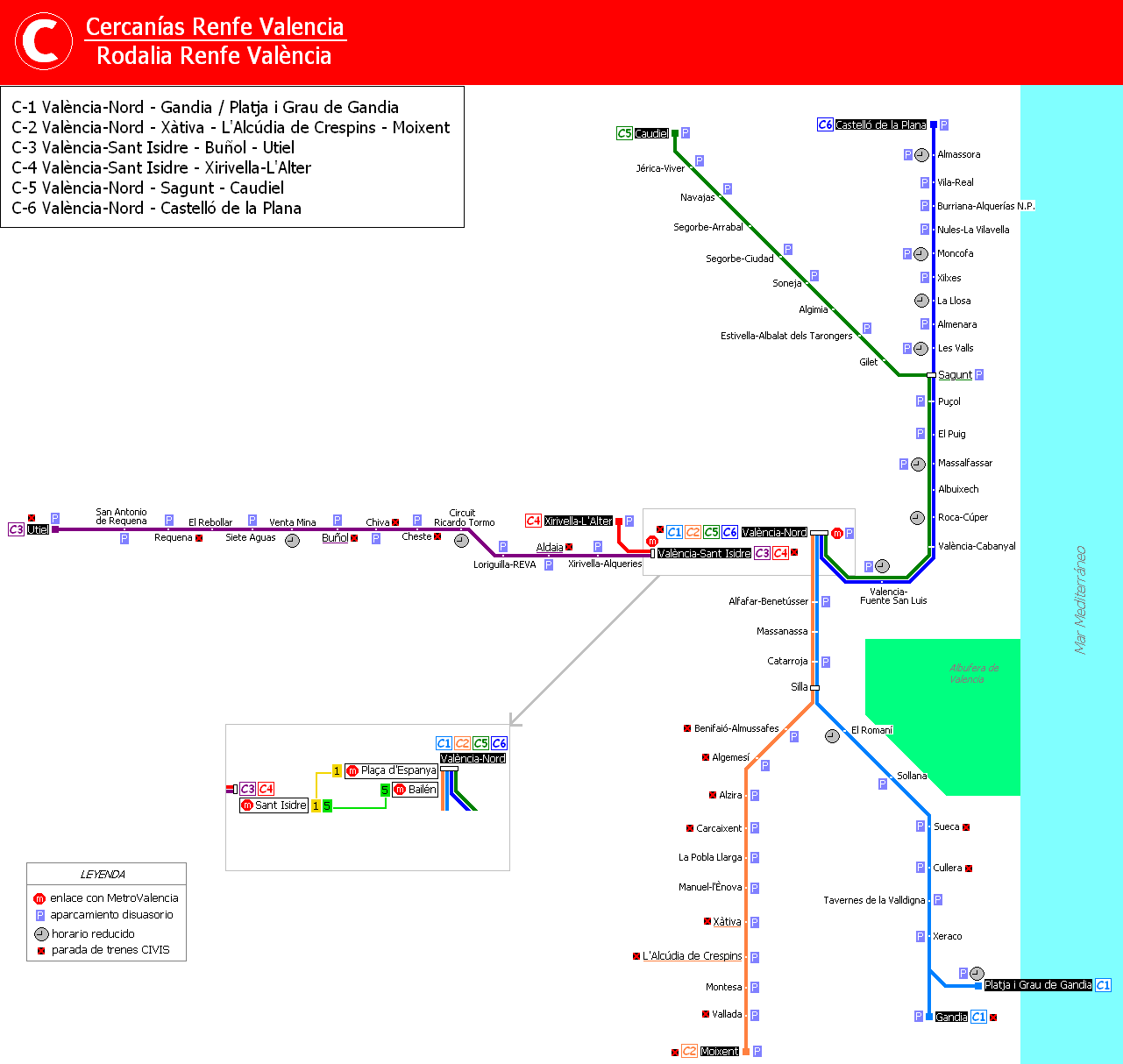
Cercanías Valencia route map

== Services ==
=== CIVIS ===
CIVIS services run on lines C-1, C-2, C-3 and C-6. These are semi-fast services which only call at selected stations; typically they run into Valencia in the morning peak and out of Valencia in the evening peak.

== Tickets and fares ==
All tickets are priced according to the station zones.

As of June 2019, single fares range from € 1.80 for one zone to € 5.80 for all six zones. Return fares range from € 3.60 to € 11.60.

The "Tarjeta Dorada" provides a 40% discount on single and return fares to all passengers aged 60 or over, students, passengers with disabilities and others.

== Rolling stock ==
Cercanías Valencia trains are operated by three classes of rolling stock:

Unit	Lines	Built by:
Renfe Class 592 (diesel multiple unit)		Macosa-MTM
Renfe Class 447 (electric multiple unit)	C-2 (Cercanías Valencia)	CAF/Siemens
Civia (electric multiple unit)	C-2 (Cercanías Valencia)	Alstom

== Future expansion ==
=== City Centre tunnel ===
As part of the Valencia Parque Central project, the rail line leading to Valencia Nord station will be put underground and the station renamed València Central. A tunnel linking it to Valencia-Cabanyal station will also be built, with two Cercanías stations in the new tunnel called Aragó and Universitat.

=== Tren de la Costa ===
The Tren de la Costa proposes a new rail line linking Valencia to Alicante via coastal towns as an extension of C-1, into which a study was produced in 2016.
