= Cercanías Sevilla =

Railway transport network in the Seville metropolitan area, Spain

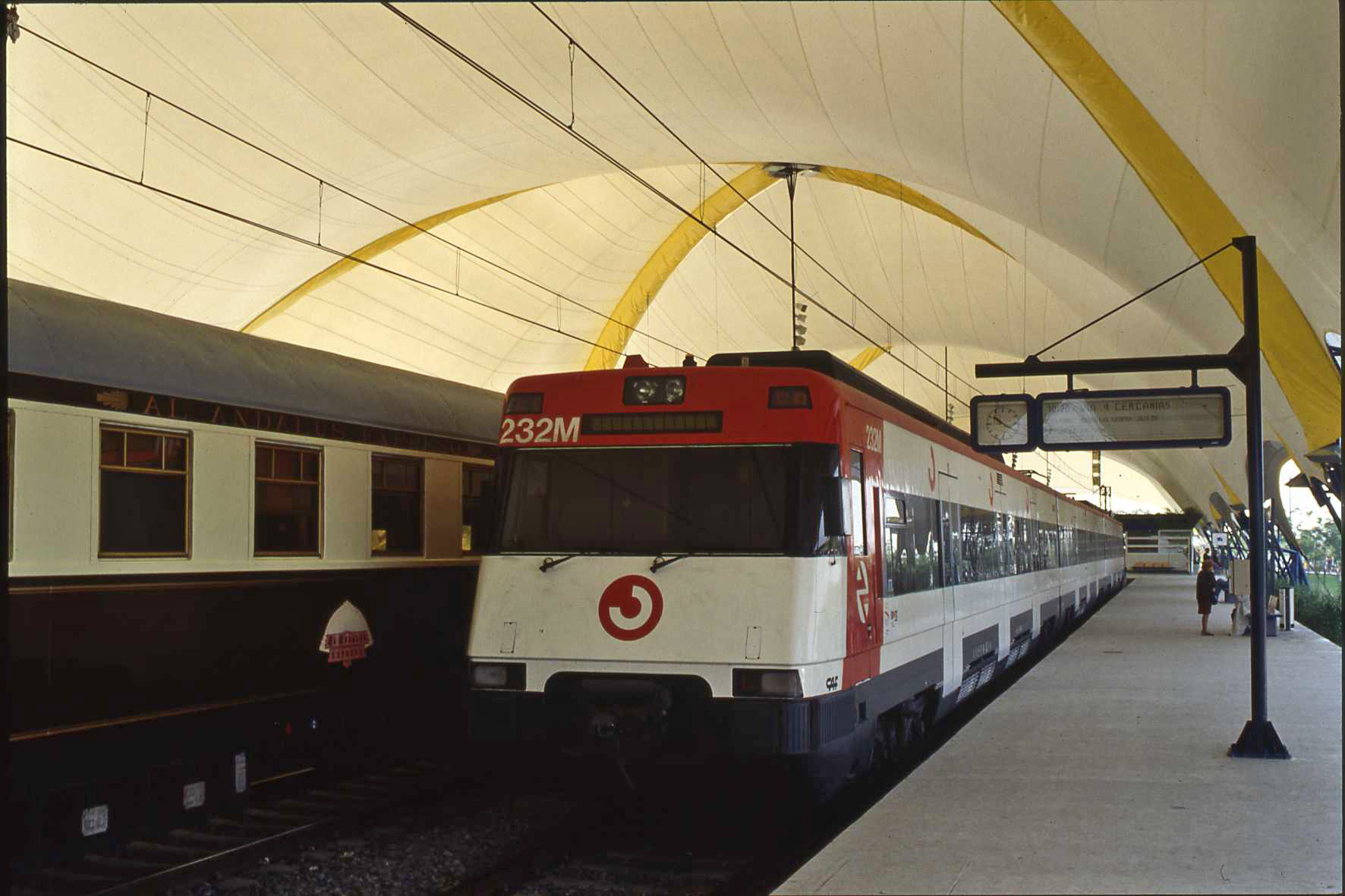
- A Cercanías Sevilla train at the temporary Sevilla Expo station in 1992

Overview
- Owner: Renfe Operadora
- Locale: Seville, Andalusia, Spain
- Transit type: Commuter rail
- Number of lines: 5
- Number of stations: 37
- Annual ridership: 7.807 million (2018)

Technical
- System length: 251 km (156 mi)
- Track gauge: 1,668 mm (5 ft 5 21/32 in)

Cercanias Sevilla is a commuter rail system operating in and around the Seville metropolitan area. Currently, it contains 5 separate lines, 251 kilometres of railway and 37 stations.

== Lines and stations ==
The network consists of five lines and thirty-seven stations. The two busiest stations on the network in 2018 were Seville-Santa Justa and Seville-San Bernardo with 1.49 million passengers each, followed by Virgen del Rocío (751,000), Utrera (719,000) and Dos Hermanas (674,000).

line	route	km
	Lora del Río - Sevilla-Santa Justa - Lebrija	106
Línea C-2 (Cercanías Sevilla)	Sevilla-Santa Justa - Cartuja	13
	Sevilla-Santa Justa - Cazalla-Constantina	84
	Circular	18
Línea C-5 (Cercanías Sevilla)	Jardines de Hércules - Sevilla-Santa Justa - Benacazón	33

=== Line C-1 Lora del Río - Sevilla Santa Justa - Lebrija ===
Línea C-1 Cercanías Sevilla
Lora del Río | Guadajoz | Los Rosales | Cantillana | Brenes | El Cáñamo | La Rinconada | Sevilla-Santa Justa | San Bernardo | Virgen del Rocío | Jardines de Hércules | Bellavista | Dos Hermanas | Cantaelgallo | Utrera | Las Cabezas de San Juan | Lebrija

=== Line C-2 Sevilla-Santa Justa - Cartuja ===
Línea C-2 Cercanías Sevilla
Sevilla-Santa Justa | San Jerónimo | Estadio Olímpico | Cartuja

=== Line C-3 Sevilla-Santa Justa - Cazalla-Constantina ===
Línea C-3 Cercanías Sevilla
Sevilla-Santa Justa | La Rinconada | El Cáñamo | Brenes | Cantillana | Los Rosales | Tocina | Alcolea del Río | Villanueva del Río y Minas | Pedroso | Cazalla-Constantina

=== Line C-4 Circular ===
Línea C-4 Cercanías Sevilla
Sevilla-Santa Justa | San Bernardo | Virgen del Rocío | Padre Pío-Palmete | Palacio de Congresos | Sevilla-Santa Justa

=== Line C-5 Jardines de Hércules - Sevilla-Santa Justa - Benacazón ===
Línea C-5 Cercanías Sevilla
Jardines de Hércules | Virgen del Rocío | San Bernardo | Sevilla-Santa Justa | San Jerónimo | Camas | Valencina-Santiponce | Salteras | Villanueva del Ariscal-Olivares | Sanlúcar la Mayor | Benacazón

== Future projects ==
A branch line connection to Seville Airport is planned.
