= Renfe =

Spanish state-owned rail transport company

Renfe-Operadora
- Type: Statutory corporation
- Industry: Rail transport
- Predecessor: Red Nacional de los Ferrocarriles Españoles
- Founded: 1 January 2005; 21 years ago
- Headquarters: Madrid, Spain
- Area served: Spain and France
- Key people: Isaías Táboas (CEO), Enrique Peña Pérez, Manuel Fresno Castro, José Luis Marroquín
- Products: Rail passenger and freight transport
- Revenue: ▲€4.12 billion (2024)
- Net income: ▲€2.9 million (2024)
- Total assets: ▲€10.8 billion (2024)
- Owner: Government of Spain
- Number of employees: ▲19,861 (2024)
- Subsidiaries: Renfe Viajeros; Renfe Mercancías; Renfe Fabricación y Mantenimiento; Renfe Alquiler de Material Ferroviario
- Website: renfe.com

Map of the Spanish rail network in 2019, with colour-coded track types. Renfe Operadora operates on conventional Iberian gauge (red), high speed (blue), and narrow gauge (green) lines.

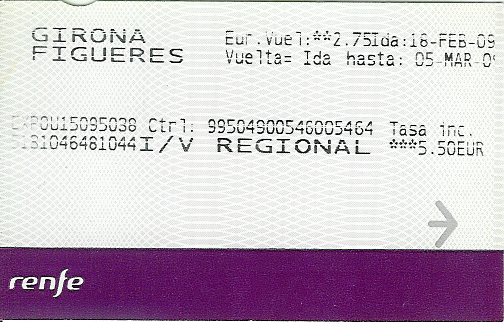
A Renfe train ticket

Renfe (Spanish pronunciation: [ˈreɱfe]; Eastern Catalan: [ˈreɱfə]), officially Renfe-Operadora, is Spain's national state-owned railway company. It was created in 2005 upon the split of the former Spanish National Railway Network (RENFE) into the Administrador de Infraestructuras Ferroviarias (ADIF), which inherited the infrastructure, and Renfe-Operadora, which inherited the railway service.

== History ==
The name "Renfe" (acronym of Red Nacional de los Ferrocarriles Españoles) is derived from that of the former Spanish National Railway Network created on 24 January 1941 with the nationalisation of Spain's railways. As per EU Directive 91/440, Renfe was divided into Renfe Operadora (operations) and ADIF (infrastructure) on 1 January 2005. At the same time, the existing Renfe logo (nicknamed the "galleta", Spanish for biscuit), first introduced in 1971, was replaced by a dark purple lower-case wordmark designed by Interbrand. Separate logos used by the other sectors were also replaced, but the old Renfe logo remains in use in some stations in Spain and on maps to indicate an ADIF station. At the end of September 2026, coinciding with the launch of a new ticket sales website, Renfe reintroduced the "galleta" after a 20 year absence, with the colour changed to match the Interbrand-designed logotype.

The Railway Sector Act, 2003 separated the management, maintenance and construction of rail infrastructure from train operation. The first activity is now the responsibility of Administrador de Infraestructuras Ferroviarias (ADIF), while the newly created Renfe-Operadora (also known as Grupo Renfe or simply Renfe) owns the rolling stock and remains responsible for the planning, marketing and operation of the passenger and freight services. This same process was followed in FEVE in 2012, whereby its infrastructure and services were merged in Adif and Renfe.

Renfe no longer has a monopoly on domestic passenger services due to Ouigo España launching in 2021, followed by Iryo in 2022.

== Structure ==
Renfe-Operadora inherited the management model of the old Renfe, which made Renfe-Operadora responsible for the operation of the passenger and freight services. In January 2006, Renfe-Operadora restructured the main business units into four general directorates:

- Dirección General de Servicios Públicos de Cercanías y Media Distancia (General Public Utilities Directorate for Suburban and Medium Distance): responsible for commuter services (Cercanías), medium-distance high-speed rail AVE services and medium-range regional services (es:Regionales and es:Media Distancia).
- Dirección General de Servicios de Larga Distancia (General Directorate of Long Distance Services): responsible for long-distance intercity and high-speed rail services (except medium-distance AVE services and Media Distancia, which is managed by the above business unit).
- Dirección General de Servicios de Mercancías y Logística (General Directorate for Freight and Logistics Services): responsible for freight services.
- Dirección General de Fabricación y Mantenimiento (General Directorate of Manufacturing and Maintenance): responsible for rolling stock maintenance and manufacture (also known as Integria).

In June 2013, Renfe's board agreed to restructure the group into four separate companies under the holding company:

- Renfe Viajeros, operating passenger trains;
- Renfe Mercancías, freight;
- Renfe Fabricación y Mantenimiento, rolling stock maintenance;
- Renfe Alquiler de Material Ferroviario, train leasing.

== Figures ==
Figures	2006	2007	2008	2009	2010	2011	2012	2013	2014	2015	2016	2017	2018	2019
Passengers (Mio.)	527,975	517,583	510,176	476,334	463,012	476,917	472,145	466,057	464,961	465,201	471,359	487,881	507,088	510,453
Passenger-kilometer (Mio.)	20,480	20,167	22,281	21,895	21,166	21,585	21,319	22,563	23,754	24,825	25,291	26,060	26,931	27,263
AVE Passengers (Tsd.)	4.878	5.559	11.461	11.250	10.851	12.563	12.101	14.697	17.967	19.428	20.352	21.108	21.332	22.370
AVE Passenger-kilometer (Tsd.)	1.884	2.161	4.888	5.260	5.171	5.846	5.793	7.095	8.038	9.230	9.632	10.267	10.289	10.760

=== Operations ===
The company operates some 12,000 km (7,500 mi) of railways, 7,000 km (4,300 mi) of them electrified. Most of the tracks are constructed to the broad Iberian gauge of 1,668 mm (5 ft 5 21/32 in), the same as that used in Portugal but wider than the international gauge of 1,435 mm (4 ft 8 1/2 in) which is standard in most of the rest of the world. The newer high-speed (AVE) network has been built to the international standard gauge of 1,435 mm for the connection to the rest of the European railway system. For this reason, the 1,435 mm gauge is generally termed "European gauge" in Spain.

Construction of a high-speed rail line between Madrid and Seville began in 1988 and began operations in 1991, going 300 km/h (190 mph). The second high-speed rail line (Madrid to Barcelona) was completed in 2007 with the inaugural service commencing on 20 February 2008. The operational speed on this route is 350 km/h (220 mph). The greater part of the line (Madrid to Lleida) entered service on 11 October 2003, with a connection to Huesca from Zaragoza. The third high-speed line (Madrid to Toledo) was opened in November 2005, followed by a spur from Córdoba to Málaga as far as Antequera in 2007. Another high-speed route from Madrid to Valladolid was opened in 2007. A line from Madrid to Valencia was opened in 2010, and the first stage of a high-speed line in Galicia opened in 2011. A line to Lisbon is being designed.

Other lines operated by Renfe include Euromed, a moderate-speed line between Barcelona and Alicante.

In addition to intercity transport, Renfe operates commuter train systems, known as Cercanías (or Rodalies/Rodalia in Catalonia and Valencia, Proximidades in Galicia, and Aldirikoak in the Basque Country), in fifteen metropolitan areas, including Madrid and Barcelona. In some cities, Renfe shares the market with other commuter railway operators, such as FGC.

In 2019, Renfe solicited bids for 31 new trains for the Asturias and Cantabria regions and the €258m contract was awarded to the CAF (Construcciones y Auxiliar de Ferrocarriles) in June 2020. Around February 2023, authorities discovered the designs were for the wrong loading gauge and would be too wide for the tunnels. Amidst international embarrassment, Renfe and ADIF each tried to deflect responsibility, and some called for the firing of the executives deemed responsible. Fortunately, the trains were still being designed, however the delivery of the trains will be delayed until 2026. Subsequently, transport officials including the president of Renfe and the Secretary of State for Transport resigned.

In November 2024, Renfe bought a 33% shareholding in Arenaways.

== Passenger rolling stock ==
Renfe-Operadora utilises the following rolling stock and commercial products inside of its two divisions:

=== Suburban and Medium Distance (DGSPCMD) ===
==== Cercanías (Commuter Services) ====
Rolling stock	Region(s)	Image
Renfe Class 433 EMU meter gauge	Asturias	FEVE_3302_(50204068577)
Renfe Class 435 EMU meter gauge	Asturias	Perlora_station_1
Renfe Class 436 EMU meter gauge	Asturias; Basque Country; Cantabria	
Renfe Class 438 EMU meter gauge	Cantabria	
Renfe Class 442 EMU meter gauge	Madrid	
Renfe Class 446 EMU Iberian gauge	Bilbao; Madrid	
Renfe Class 447 EMU Iberian gauge	Barcelona; Madrid; Valencia; Murcia/Alicante; San Sebastián; Santander	S03_304_Bf_San_Pol_del_Mar,_447_142
Renfe Class 450 EMU Iberian gauge	Barcelona; Madrid	
Renfe Class 462/463/464/465 EMU Iberian gauge	Asturias; Barcelona; Cádiz; Madrid; Málaga; Sevilla; Valencia; Zaragoza	RENFE_Civia_-_Silla_-_2014-07-24
Renfe Class 526 DMU meter gauge	Asturias; Castile and León	
Renfe Class 529 DMU meter gauge	Castile and León; Galicia; Murcia	Villaquilambre_-_Apeadero_de_Feve-Adif_1
Renfe Class 592 DMU Iberian gauge	Valencia; Murcia/Alicante	

==== Mainline Medium Distance Services ====
Rolling stock	Route(s)	Image
Renfe Class 440/470 EMU Iberian gauge (to be phased out)	Córdoba – Rabanales; León – Ponferrada – Vigo; León – Gijón; Valladolid – Santander; Valladolid – Ávila; Valladolid – León; Valencia – Barcelona; Valencia – Alicante	
Renfe Class 448 EMU Iberian gauge	Catalunya; Aragón	RENFE_448_(14519718446)
Renfe Class 449 EMU Iberian gauge	Madrid – Jaén; León – Ponferrada – Orense – Vigo; Sevilla – Cádiz; Barcelona – Girona – Figueres – Portbou; Huelva – Sevilla; Jaén – Córdoba – Sevilla – Cadiz; Madrid – Alcázar de San Juan – Albacete; Madrid – Alcázar de San Juan – Ciudad Real; Alicante – Albacete – Ciudad Real; Madrid – León; Madrid – Vitoria; Irun - Vitoria - Miranda de Ebro; Córdoba – Bobadilla; Barcelona – Reus; Barcelona – Tortosa	S2781_Bf_Madrid_Chamartín,_9_449_009
Renfe Class 524 DMU metric gauge	Ferrol – Oviedo; Oviedo – Santander; Santander – Bilbao	FEVE_Cerdido
Renfe Class 527 DMU metric gauge	Ferrol – Oviedo; Oviedo – Santander; Santander – Bilbao; Bilbao – León	
Renfe Class 592 DMU Iberian gauge (to be phased out)	Madrid – Talavera; Murcia – Cartagena; Valencia − Alcoi; CELTA: Oporto - Vigo (Service CP)	
Renfe Class 594 DMU Iberian gauge	Valladolid – Zamora – Puebla de Sanabria; A Coruña – Ferrol; A Coruña – Lugo – Monforte de Lemos - Ourense; Madrid – Soria; Murcia – Cartagena	Renfe_Class_594_(8649324591)
Renfe Class 598 DMU Iberian gauge	Cáceres – Valencia de Alcántara; Sevilla – Cáceres - Madrid	Regional_Cuenca_-_Madrid_en_Paredes_-_51734173215
Renfe Class 599 DMU Iberian gauge	Madrid – Badajoz; Huelva – Zafra; A Coruña – Vigo Guixar; Salamanca – Ávila – Madrid; Salamanca – Palencia; Valencia – Cartagena; Zaragoza – Valencia; Zaragoza – Cartagena; Sevilla – Málaga; Sevilla – Almería; Granada – Algeciras; Málaga – Ronda; Granada – Linares; Madrid – Águilas	RENFE_599_087_Piñar

==== High-Speed Medium Distance Services ====
Rolling stock	Route(s)	Image
Renfe Class 104 EMU	Madrid – Toledo; Madrid – Ciudad Real; Málaga – Granada; Sevilla – Córdoba; Barcelona – Camp De Tarragona; Sevilla - Málaga	
Renfe Class 114 EMU	Madrid – Puertollano; Madrid – Valladolid; Barcelona – Figueres; Barcelona – Lleida; Sevilla – Granada	Renfe_Avant_S114_(40363123383)
Renfe Class 121 EMU	Cádiz – Jaén; A Coruña – Ourense; A Coruña – Vigo Urzaiz; Madrid – Ponferrada; Ponferrada-Vigo; Madrid – Gandia; Madrid-Salamanca	RENFE_121_501_Vilches

=== Long Distance (DGSLD) ===
==== Luxury Tourist Train Services ====
Service	Route(s)	Locomotive	Passenger Car	Image
Al Ándalus	Sevilla - Granada - Úbeda - Sevilla	Renfe Class 319.3 Locomotive	Al Ándalus	Renfe_319.323_+_319.304_"Al_Andalus"_(48373548251)
Costa Verde Express	Bilbao - Santiago de Compostela; Santiago de Compostela - Bilbao	Renfe Class 619 Locomotive	El Transcantábrico	FEVE_1916_+_"El_Transcantábrico"_(50101413867)
El Transcantábrico Gran Lujo	San Sebastián–Santiago de Compostela; Santiago de Compostela–San Sebastián	Renfe Class 619 Locomotive	El Transcantábrico	FEVE_1916_+_"El_Transcantábrico"_(50182318097)
La Robla Express	"La Robla Route:"; Bilbao - León; León - Bilbao "Pilgrim's Route:"; Oviedo - Ortigueira - Santiago de Compostela - Oviedo	Renfe Class 316.500 Locomotive	La Robla	El_Expreso_de_la_Robla_-_seascape

==== Mainline Long Distance Services ====
Service(s)	Route(s)	Locomotive	Passenger Car	Image
Intercity	Madrid – Algeciras; Madrid – Granada; Madrid – Murcia – Cartagena; Madrid – Almería; Barcelona – Murcia – Cartagena/Lorca; Madrid – Cáceres – Badajoz	Renfe Class 334 Locomotive	Talgo Pendular	RENFE_334_018_Campillos
Intercity	Madrid – Almería; Barcelona – Murcia – Cartagena/Lorca; Madrid – Valencia	Renfe Class 252 Locomotive	Talgo Pendular	252-066-6,_Spain,_Tarragona,_Port_Aventura_-_Tres_Camins_stretch_(Trainpix_199420)

==== High-Speed Long Distance Services ====
Service	Rolling stock	Route(s)	Image
AVE	Renfe Class 100 EMU	Madrid – Sevilla; Madrid – Castellón; Huesca–Sevilla	J20_676_Bf_Perpignan,_9_100_121_Renfe
AVE	Renfe Class 102 EMU	Madrid – León; Madrid – Huesca; Valencia – Sevilla	AVE_S-102._Viaducto_sobre_el_Arroyo_de_Pedro_Gil_(32308646046)
AVE	Renfe Class 103 EMU	Madrid – Barcelona – Figueres; Madrid – Málaga; Barcelona – Málaga	
AVE	Renfe Class 106 EMU	Gijón–Castellón; Madrid–Gijón; Madrid–A Coruña; Madrid–Vigo; Madrid – Murcia; Madrid – Marseille; Barcelona – Lyon	
AVE	Renfe Class 112 EMU	Madrid – Alicante; Madrid – Burgos; Madrid – Cuenca – Valencia; Madrid – Granada; Madrid – Murcia; Madrid – Ourense; Alicante – Ourense; Alicante – León; Barcelona – Granada; Barcelona – Sevilla; Burgos – Valencia; Málaga – Murcia; León – Valencia	
Alvia (mixed high-speed & conventional service)	Renfe Class 120 EMU	Madrid – Pamplona; Madrid – Logroño; Madrid – Irún/Hendaya; Madrid – Bilbao; Madrid – Salamanca; Madrid – Santander; Madrid – Huelva; Barcelona – Bilbao; Barcelona – San Sebastian; Torre del Oro: Barcelona – Valencia – Sevilla – Cádiz	Alvia_Vigo-Barcelona,_el_tren_escoba_(3710893886)
Alvia (mixed high-speed & conventional service)	Renfe Class 130 EMU	Madrid – Avilés; Madrid – Cádiz; Alicante – Gijón; Alicante – Santander; Barcelona – A Coruña; Barcelona – Vigo; Barcelona – Salamanca; Euromed: Barcelona – Valencia – Alicante	RENFE_Alvia_S-130.000_(24547010389)
Alvia (mixed high-speed & conventional service)	Renfe Class 730 HMU	Madrid – Algeciras; Madrid – Almeria; Madrid – Ferrol; Madrid – Vigo; Madrid – Lugo; Madrid – Badajoz	RENFE_Class_730_Viaducto_Martin_Gil

=== Prototype rolling stock ===
Service	Rolling stock	Image
AVE	Renfe Class 105 EMU	Oaris_de_CAF_(105.001)_en_proves_per_Vilafant

=== Future rolling stock ===
Service	Rolling stock	Quantity
Cercanías	Renfe Class 452 EMU	201
Cercanías	Renfe Class 453 EMU	79
Cercanías	Renfe Class 412 and 413 EMU	32
Cercanías	Renfe Class 402 EMU	6
Cercanías	Renfe Class 460 EMU	29
Media Distancia	Renfe Class 480 EMU	28
Media Distancia	Renfe Class 714 BMU	6
AVE	Renfe Class 106 EMU	30
AVE	Renfe Class 107 EMU	13

== Vehicles register numbers ==
All classes are designated by three numbers. The first digit has a special meaning:

- 1xx: High speed multiple unit
- 2xx: Electric locomotive
- 3xx: Diesel locomotive
- 4xx: Electric multiple unit (EMU)
- 5xx: Diesel multiple unit (DMU)
- 6xx: Hybrid locomotive
- 7xx: Bi-modal multiple unit (BMU) (hybrid)
- 8xx: Trams which can run on railways

== Tickets ==
Travel tickets are available from rail stations and online. In 2023 the European Commission initiated an investigation into concerns that Renfe might have been abusing its dominant position in the online ticketing market by refusing to share journey time information with competing ticketing websites. Renfe offered a number of commitments intended to address these concerns, which the European Commission made legally binding in January 2024 under the EU's competition rules.

== See also ==
- History of rail transport in Spain
- Rail transport in Spain
- Transport in Spain
- Madrid, Zaragoza and Alicante railway

== Notes ==
1. Operated by CP in Portugal.
2. Managed by Elipsos under the brand Renfe-SNCF en Cooperación/en Coopération.
