= Parque de los Príncipes (Seville Metro) =

Seville Metro station

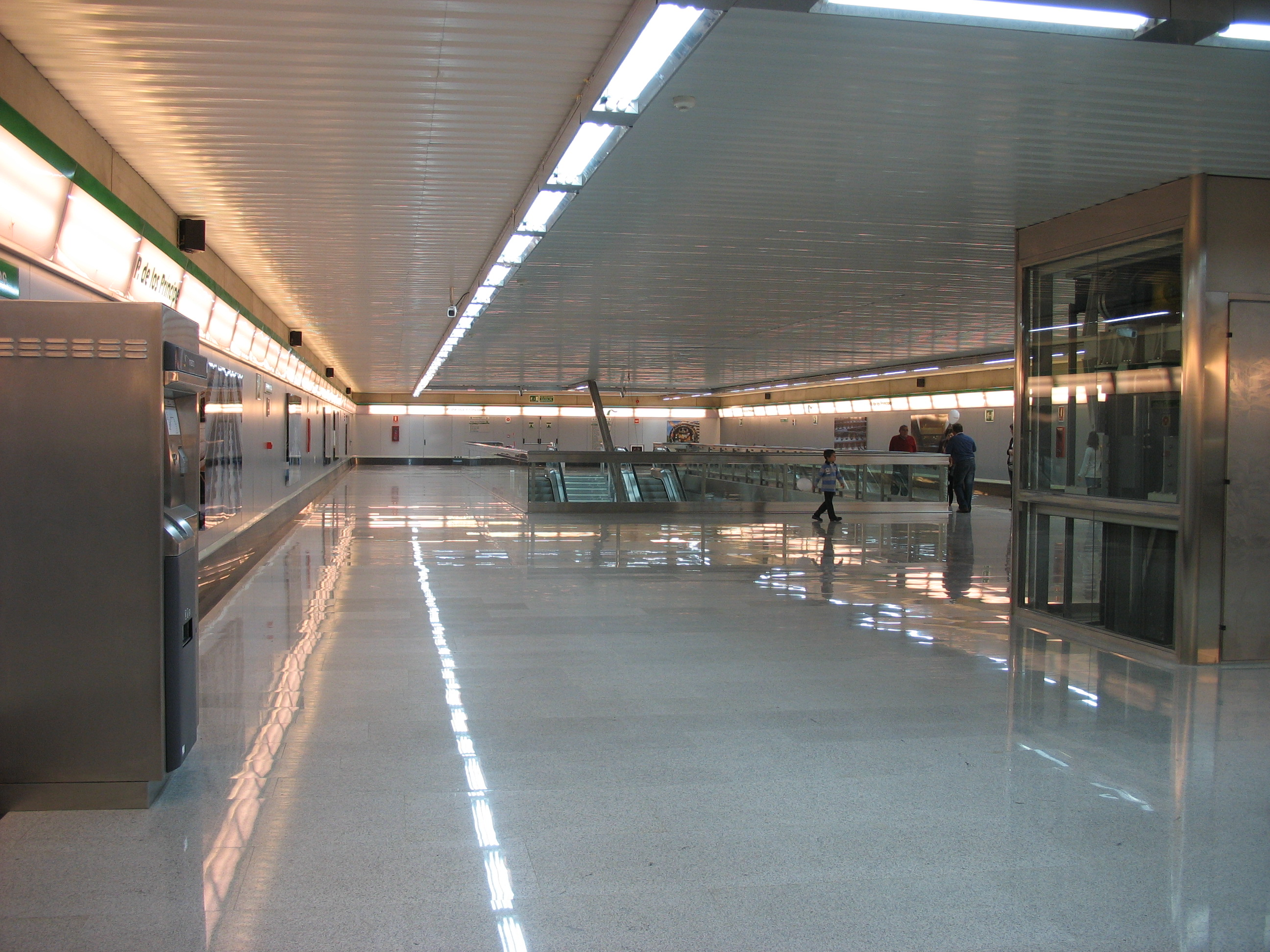

General information
- Location: Av. República Argentina, Los Remedios, Seville, Andalusia; Spain
- Coordinates: 37°22′37″N 6°00′13″W
- Platforms: 1 Island platform, 65 m long, with platform screen doors
- Tracks: 2

Construction
- Structure type: Underground
- Depth: 16 m (52 ft)
- Accessible: Yes

Other information
- Fare zone

History
- Opened: 2 April 2009; 17 years ago

Services
| Preceding station | Seville Metro | Following station |
|---|---|---|
| Blas Infante towards Ciudad Expo | Line 1 | Plaza de Cuba towards Olivar de Quintos |
Location

Parque de los Príncipes is a station on line of the Seville Metro. It is located at the intersection of República Argentina Avenue and López de Gomara Avenue, in the Los Remedios district.

== Location and structure ==
Parque de los Príncipes is an underground station, situated between Blas Infante and Plaza de Cuba stations on line 1.

=== Platform and safety features ===
The station has an island platform with shared accesses and platform screen doors to prevent falls onto the tracks. It is also equipped with emergency evacuation systems to ensure passenger safety.

== Connections ==
Bus: 5, 6, C1, C2, M-140, M-150, M-151, M-152, M-153, M-162, M-240

== Future expansion ==
There are plans for line of the metro to connect with Parque de los Príncipes in the future, though the project remains in the planning phase.

== See also ==
- List of Seville metro stations
