= Magnus Gutke =

Swedish musician

Magnus Gutke (born December 8, 1965), is a Swedish concert guitarist trained at the Conservatory École Normale de Musique de Paris. His debut album Touché was released in 1997 by RCA Victor. Gutke plays on a guitar built by Paulino Bernabe Senior.

== Discography ==
Touché I was Gutke's debut recording. The album was originally released by BMG / RCA Victor in 1997.

Touché II consists of guitar music by French and Spanish composers, including Eduardo Sainz de la Maza, Antonio José, Maurice Ohana, and Henri Sauguet.

Silver och jag consists of recitative interspersed with classical guitar. The lyrics are a selection from the Nobel laureate Juan Ramón Jiménez's best known work Platero y Yo. The music is composed by Spanish composer Eduardo Sainz de la Maza, inspired by the literary work.
