= Ateneo de Sevilla =

Cultural association in Spain

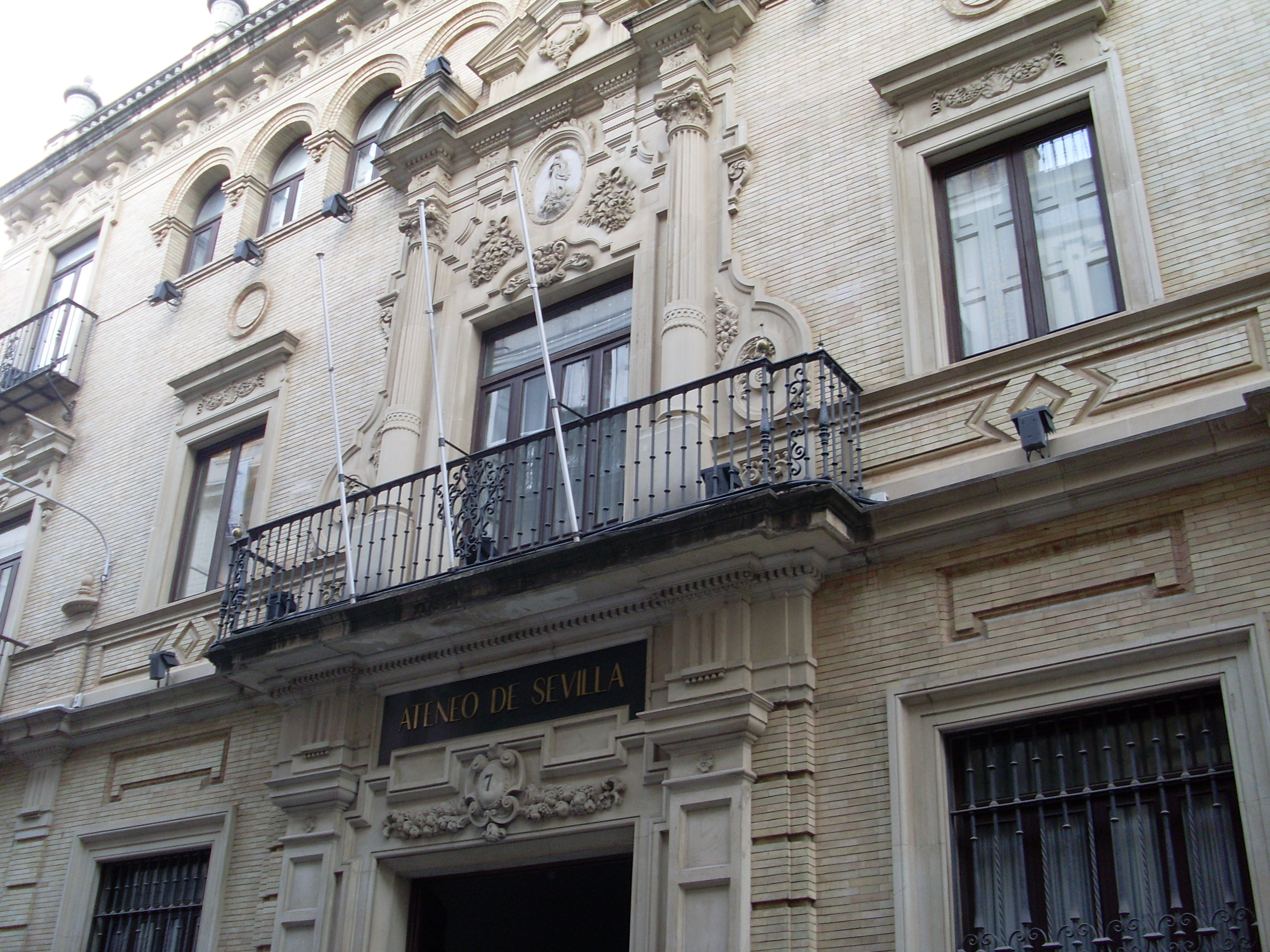
Main façade, Ateneo de Sevilla, designed by Vicente Traver y Tomás

The Ateneo de Sevilla, originally called Excursions Ateneo and Society, is a cultural association in Seville, Spain which was founded in 1887 by Dr. Manuel Gaudencio Sales y Ferrèr. It became prominent in the early 20th century and was known for its meetings of the Generation of '27.

== Activities ==
Writers such as Juan Ramón Jiménez, José María Izquierdo, and Joaquín Romero Murube were all members of the Ateneo de Sevilla. Jiménez came from his native city of Moguer to Seville to pursue a degree in law. He is known for writing Platero and I and The Diary of a Newlywed Poet. He claimed that he became a writer and poet in the library of Ateneo de Sevilla. The association also included politicians such as Pedro Rodríguez de la Borbolla, Blas Infante, Diego Martinez Barrio. and Miguel Bravo-Ferrer.

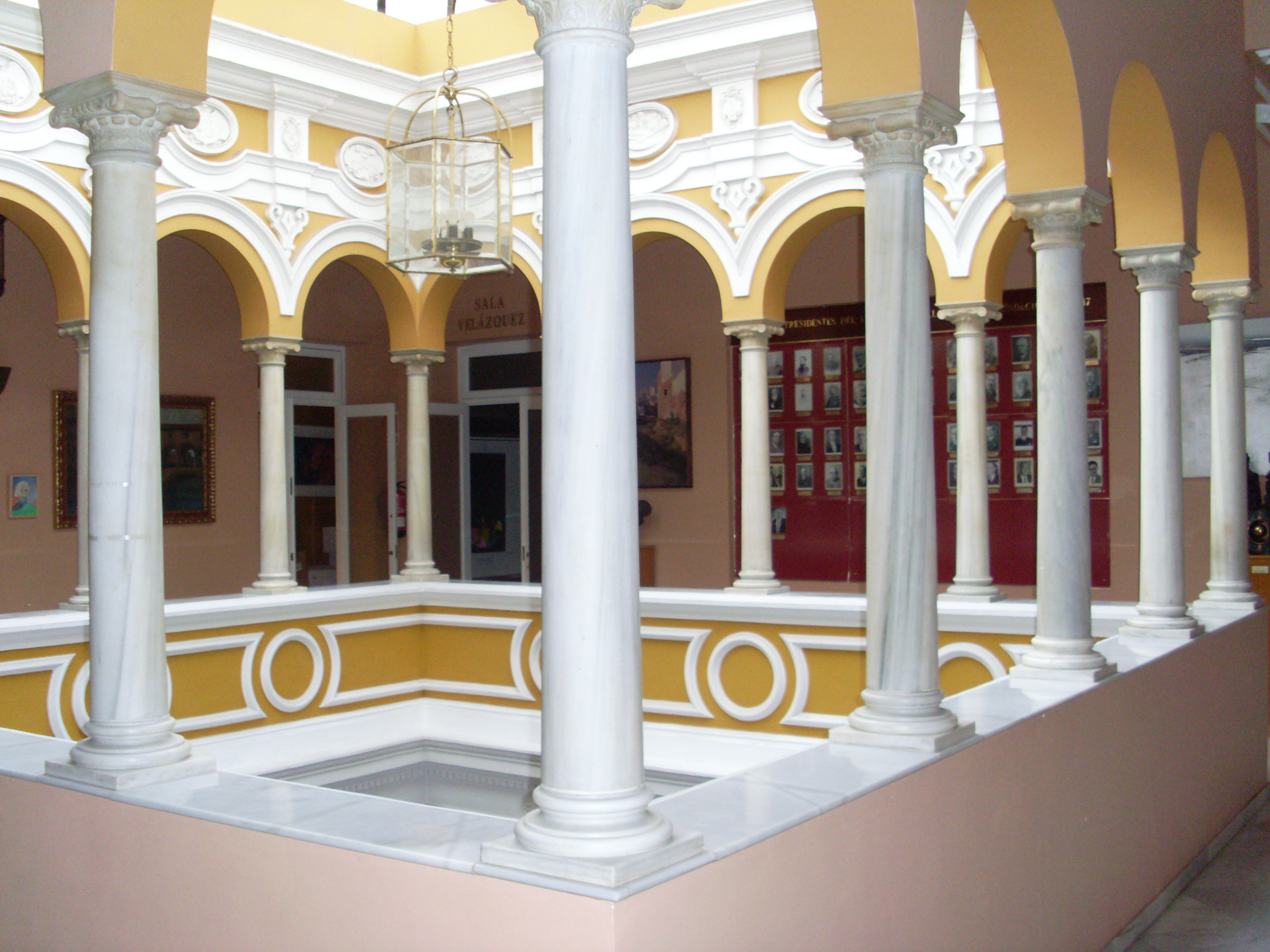
The courtyard of the Ateneo de Sevilla

The popular Kings Parade, which emerged in 1918, was an initiative of the Ateneo de Sevilla. The parade, organized by the Ateneo de Sevilla every year since, is prominent among the major festivals of the city.

The Ateneo de Sevilla inspired the creation of the Isla Cristina Ateneo, a similar organization based in Andalucia. It opened on September 10, 1926, as a result of the collaboration of Blas Infante.

The Ateneo de Sevilla has many regularly occurring cultural initiatives. A notable event is the Ateneo de Sevilla Awards, in which the "Novel", "Young Novel", "Historical Novel", "Painting", "History", and "Trial and Updates" awards are given. The Ateneo's activities also include lectures, panel discussions, debates, book presentations, and exhibitions. In 2012, the institution celebrated its 125th anniversary.

The Ateneo de Sevilla invites national and international personalities to the city as guests, with the goal of bringing analysis and reflection to the most diverse sectors of the population of Seville, including historical and current topics. To this end, during the term of the current President of the Ateneo, Alberto Máximo Pérez Calero, lecturers have included Anna Ferrer, widow of Vincent Ferrer (who received the "Prince of Asturias Award for Concord" for his work with The Vicente Ferrer Foundation in India) and José Antonio Marina, renowned Spanish educator, philosopher, and writer.

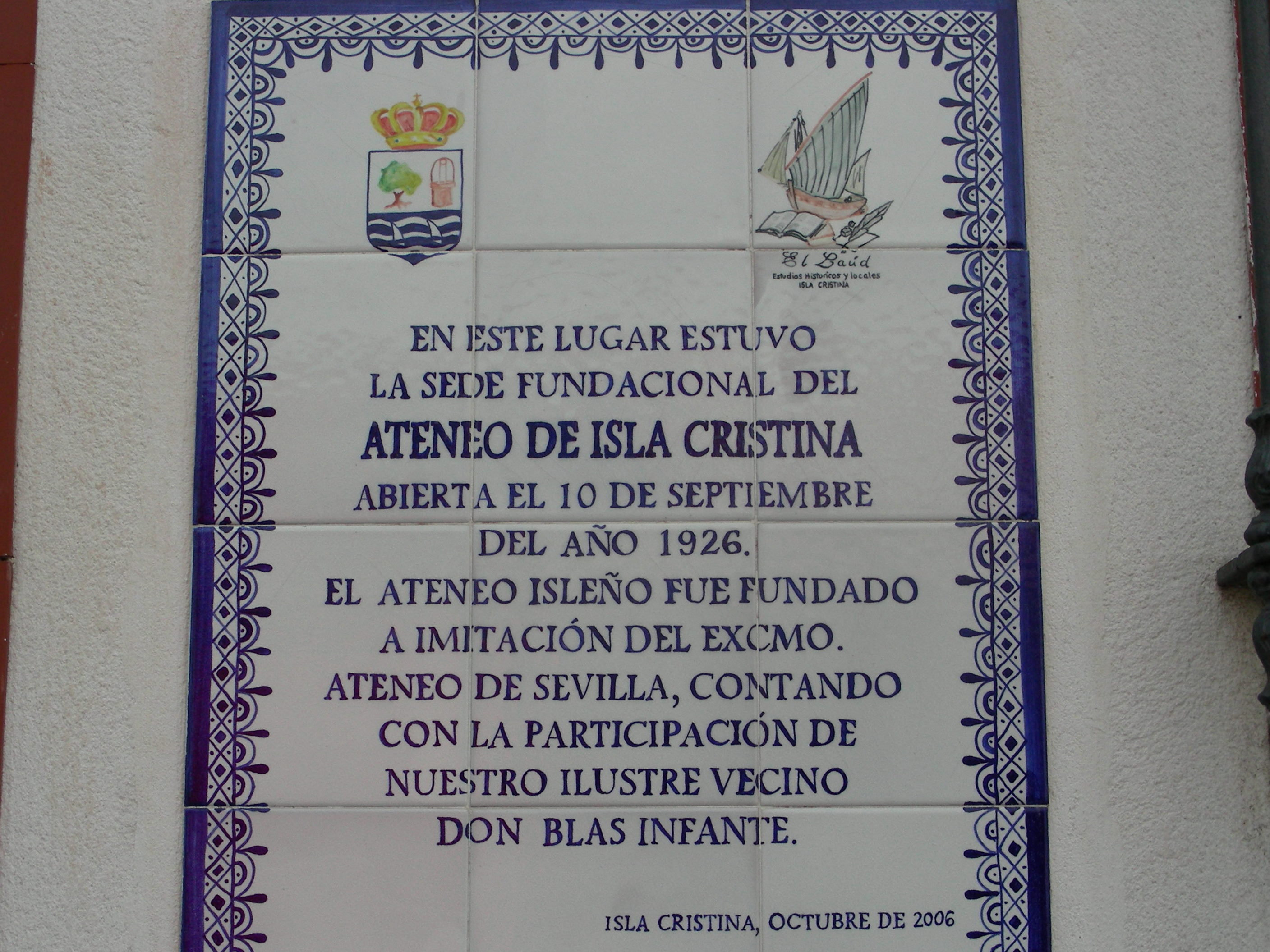
A plaque at the Atheneum of Isla Cristina (province of Huelva) noting that it was founded in imitation of the Ateneo de Sevilla

== Generation of '27 ==
During the presidency of Blasco José María Romero Garzon, the physician and poet José María Romero Martínez (1893–1936) was responsible for organizing a commemoration for the 300th anniversary of the death of Spanish poet Luis de Góngora. Leading representatives of Spanish poetry attended the event, which was held on December 16 and 17, 1927, at the Economic Society of Friends of the Country in Seville. Pictures taken of the event by Serrano show Blasco Garzón at center, with numerous people to either side, including Rafael Alberti, Federico García Lorca, Juan Chabás Salvador Bacarisse, Jorge Guillen, José Bergamin, Damaso Alonso, Gerardo Diego, Luis Cernuda, Fernando Villalón, Pedro Salinas, Rafael Porlán, Adriano del Valle, Amantina Cobos, the painter Villalobos, Collantes, Romero Murube Labrador Llosent, Antonio Espina, Fernández Almagro, San Román Muñoz, Rafael Laffón, Gustavo Bacarisas, the matador Sanchez Mejias, Juan Miguel Sanchez, Lafita, Majo, Nunez Cabezas de Herrera, Tamayo, and José de la Peña. This act is considered the founding document of the Generation of '27, despite the diversity of the people present.

== Presidency ==
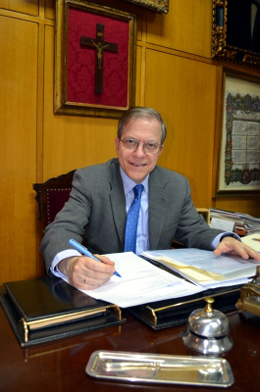
Alberto Máximo Pérez Calero, the President of the Ateneo de Sevilla

Since 2010, Alberto Máximo Pérez Calerothe has been the president of the Ateneo de Sevilla. He is a doctor specializing in family practice, internal medicine, and gastroenterology. He is also an academician of the Royal Academy of Medicine of Seville, Murcia, and Vélez de Guevara (Ecija). From 1994 until he became president, Alberto Máximo Pérez Calero was a director of the institution in the chairs of literature and medicine, assistant to the president and secretary general. He has published several books and dozens of articles on the Ateneo de Sevilla.
