= Eloise Roach =

American translator (1893-1979)

- Born: July 18, 1893; Duval County, Texas, U.S.
- Died: November 29, 1979 (aged 86)
- Occupation: Translator
- Awards: Guggenheim Fellowship (1959)

Academic background
- Education: University of Texas in Austin (BA and MA)

Academic work
- Sub-discipline: Juan Ramón Jiménez
- Institutions: University of Texas in Austin

Eloise Roach (January 18, 1893 – November 29, 1979) was an American translator. She published two volumes of translated works from the Spanish Nobel Prize laureate Juan Ramón Jiménez, with one of them done on a 1959 Guggenheim Fellowship. She also worked in education, including as a teacher at Stephen F. Austin High School.

== Biography ==
Roach was born in Duval County, Texas, on January 18, 1893. (Note: Despite the John Simon Guggenheim Memorial Foundation's Reports of the Secretary and Treasurer giving her a birth date of January 18, 1903, an 1893 birth year is supported both by her archival fonds and an obituary pointing to an age of 86.) During her youth, she read frequently (the house was full of books) and even wrote several poems (including an epic poem), now lost. She was homeschooled and did not have a high school diploma, but easily applied to the University of Texas in Austin with the help of dean Harry Yandell Benedict. At UT Austin, she spent an entire summer as the Daily Texan's night editor, and obtained a BA in Spanish and French in 1926 and an MA in Spanish in 1933. She studied at the University of Paris, where she obtained a certificat in 1939.

After teaching at Louisiana State University and Stephen F. Austin State Teacher's College, Roach worked as a teacher at Stephen F. Austin High School from 1934 to 1963; subjects she taught included English, French, and Spanish. While working at the high school, she published two Spanish textbooks with the National Textbook Company in 1935 and 1936. From 1965 to 1967, she later worked at UT Austin as an assistant instructor for French student-teachers. By 1971, she was still receiving letters of gratitude from her former high school students.

Roach started translating Platero y yo by Juan Ramón Jiménez after discovering it while working at the State Teacher's College. Jiménez accepted her offer to have the translation published, though at least two decades passed before the book was released, which happened in 1957 after he won the 1956 Nobel Prize in Literature and Roach reached out to University of Texas Press director Frank H. Wardlaw accordingly. In 1959, she was awarded a Guggenheim Fellowship to study Jiménez's work at the University of Puerto Rico library, as well as other Latin American poets; the resulting work, Juan Ramón Jiménez: Three Hundred Poems, 1903-1953, was published from UT Press in 1962.

Roach owned four cats. At the time of her death, she was living in Austin, Texas.

Roach was ill for two years in the 1960s, and later had several episodes of myocardial infarction in the 1970s. Roach died on November 29, 1979, leaving behind several unfinished projects. She was 86. Her archives are held at the Austin History Center.

== Works ==
- (translated from Spanish to English) Platero and I (1957; original by Juan Ramón Jiménez)
- (translated from Spanish to English) Three Hundred Poems, 1903-1953 (1962; original by Juan Ramón Jiménez)
