= Mexican Pavilion =

- Pabellón de México
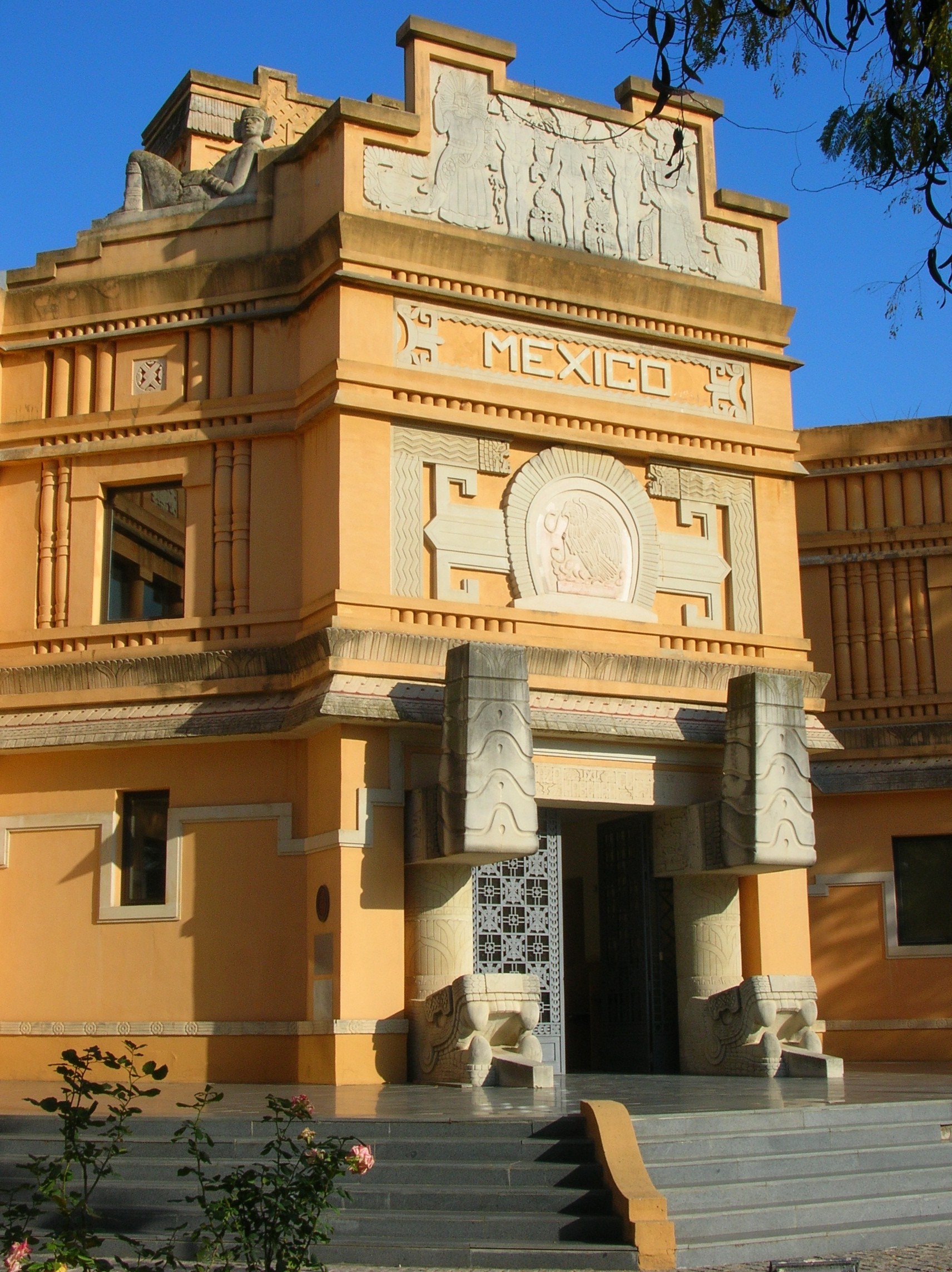
- Interactive map of the Mexican Pavilion area

General information
- Location: Avenida Palmera, Seville, Spain
- Construction started: 1927
- Construction stopped: 1928
- Landlord: Seville University

Design and construction
- Architect: Manuel María Amábilis Domínguez

The Mexican Pavilion from the Ibero-American Exposition of 1929 is located on Avenida de la Palmera in Seville, next to the Brazilian Pavilion, and today hosts a branch of the University of Seville.

== History ==
Its construction took place on a 5.442 km^{2} piece of ground ceded in 1926, while labor was in charge of the Mexican Secretary of Industry, Commerce and Labour, directed by Luis N. Morones. Its architect was Manuel María Amábilis Domínguez, from Mérida, Yucatán, who proposed the project named "ITZA" in collaboration with two Yucatecan artists, Leopoldo Tommasi López (in charge of the sculptures) and Víctor Manuel Reyes (in charge of the drawings). The building is inspired on Mesoamerican architecture; specifically the Maya architectural style known as Puuc and the Toltec-influenced style of Chichen Itza, both found in Yucatán. The construction began at the beginning of 1927 and ended in August 1928, despite having undergone some renovations in its interior. On its facade appear some reliefs with allegories and sculptures, and by the time of the exposition the interior was very profusely decorated and packed with craft objects. The building also has a backyard with a fountain decorated with Maya and Toltec motives.

== Gallery ==
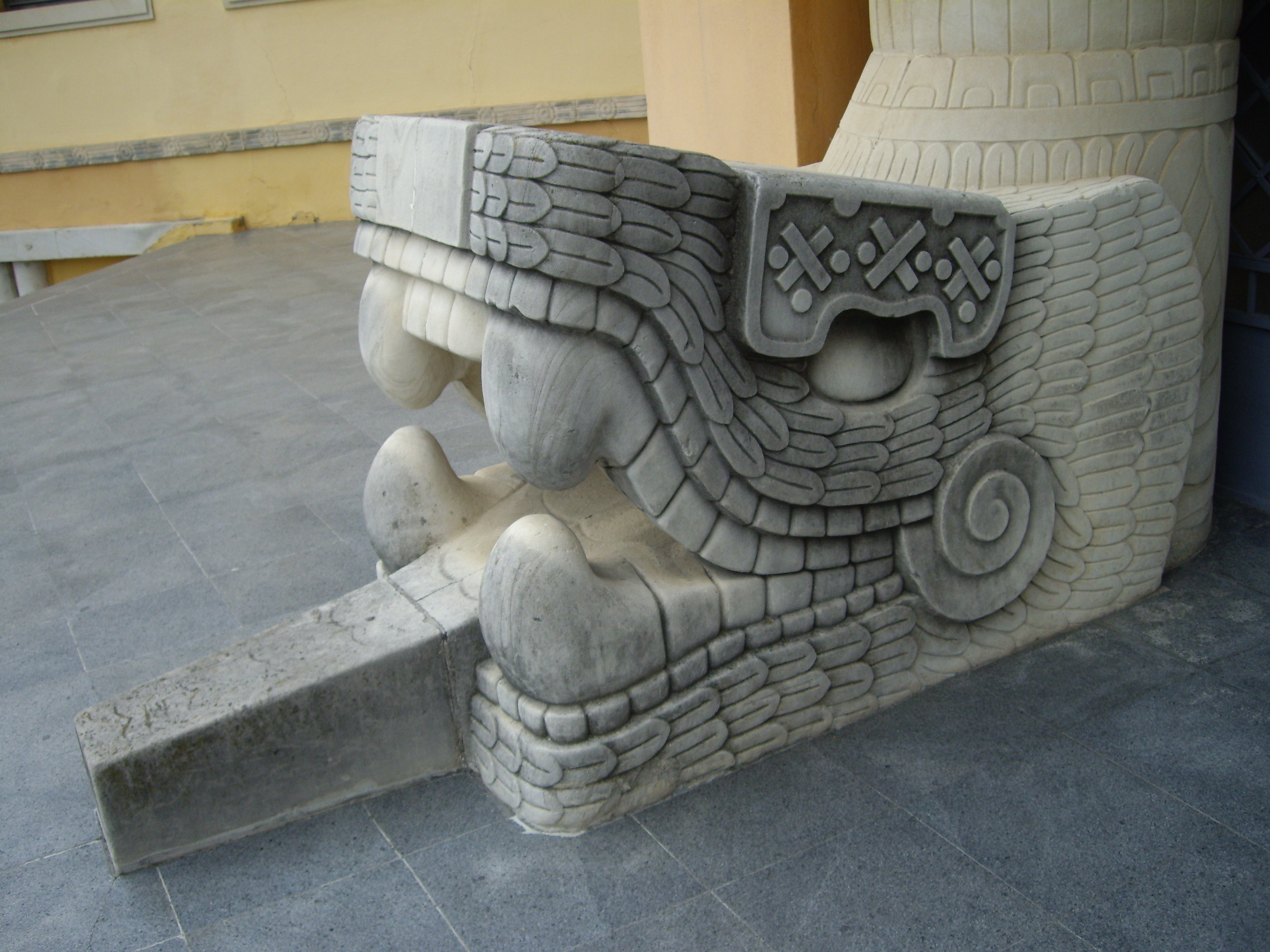

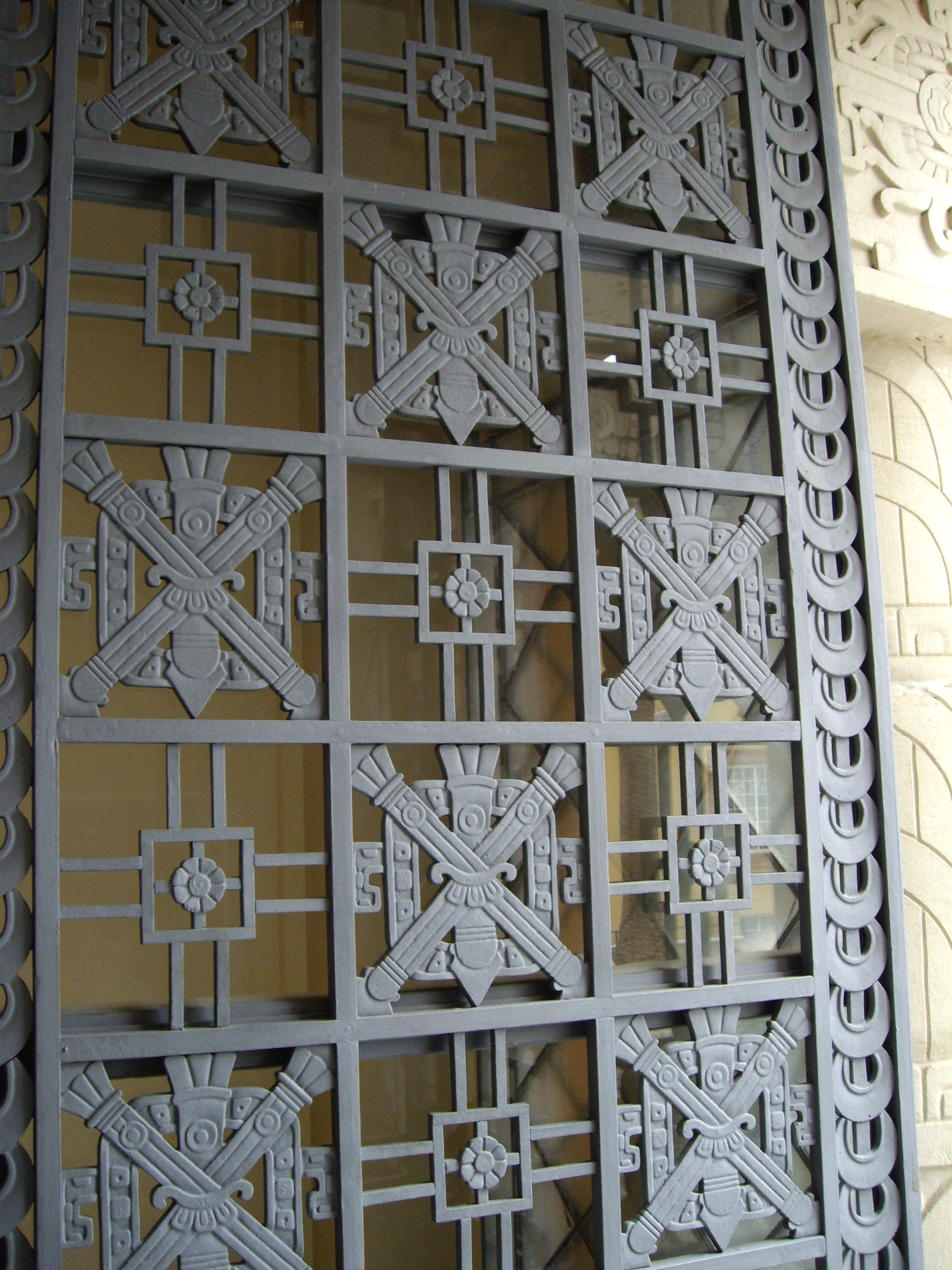
