= Peruvian pavilion, Seville =

Building and consulate in Seville, Spain

Pabellón de Perú
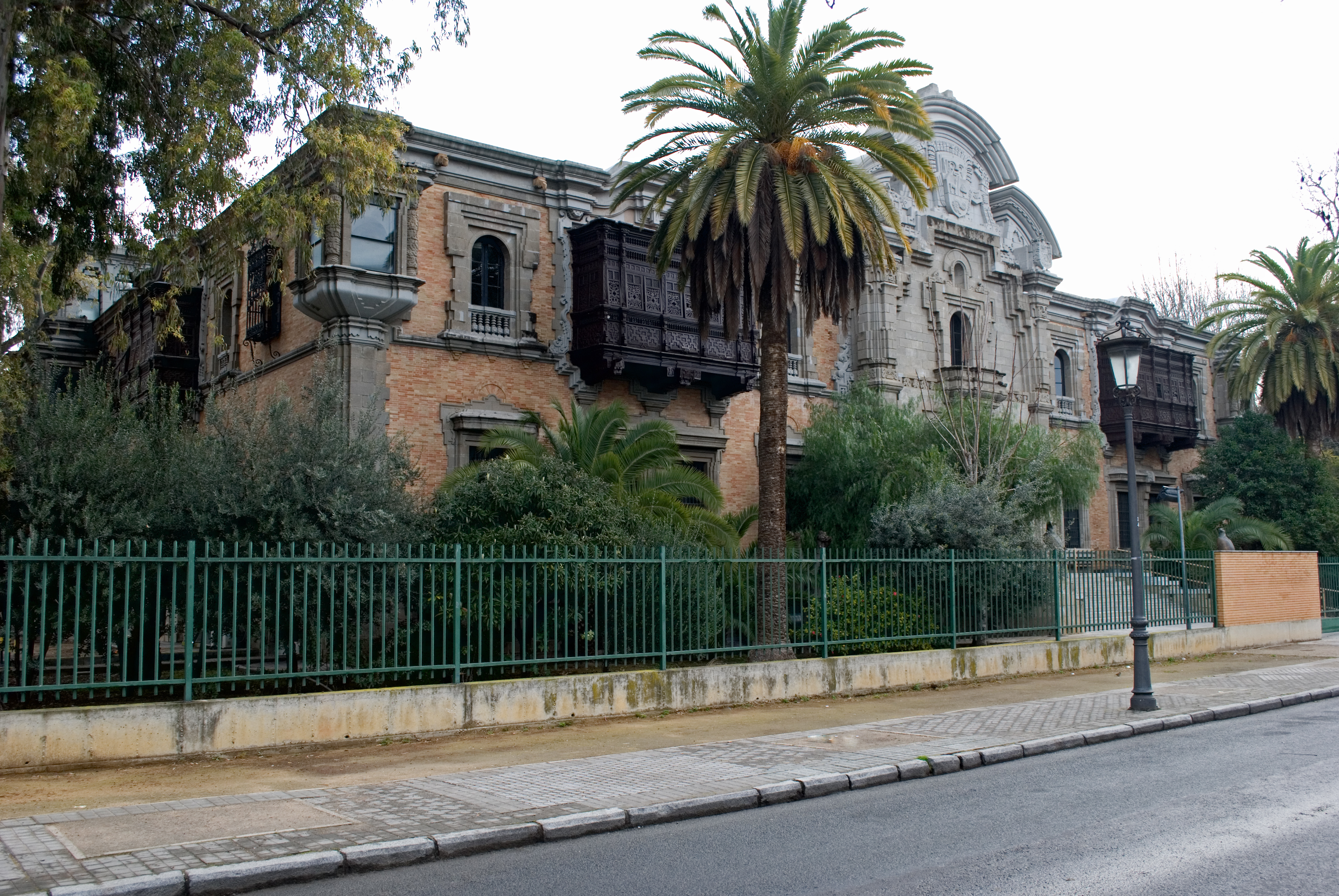
- The building in 2009

General information
- Architectural style: Baroque Revival
- Address: Av. de María Luisa S/N
- Year(s) built: 1927–1929
- Inaugurated: October 19, 1929

Technical details
- Floor count: 2

Design and construction
- Architect(s): Manuel Piqueras Cotolí

Website
- Website of the Peruvian consulate

The Peruvian pavilion (Spanish: Pabellón de Perú) is a multi-purpose building in Seville, Spain. Built to house the Peruvian exhibition of the 1929 Ibero-American Exposition, it currently functions as the Consulate-General of Peru in the city and also houses a science museum, La Casa de la Ciencia.

== History ==
It was created on the occasion of the Ibero-American Exposition of 1929. It was built from the project designed by the architect Manuel Piqueras Cotolí, the pavilion was conceived as a work with strong mestizo and colonial characters, a mix of Spanish roots and pre-Hispanic Peruvian cultures.

From 1984 to 2007, it housed the Doñana Biological Station of the Spanish National Research Council.

== List of Consuls general ==
- Humberto Urteaga Dulanto: 2007–2010
- Oscar Guillermo Barrenechea Núñez del Arco: 2010–2013
- Javier Martín Sánchez-Checa Salazar: 2013–2015
- República Lucía Cristina Trindade Díaz de Buitrón: 2015–2017
- Gonzalo Zapater Vargas-Quintanilla: 2017–2021
- José Antonio Doig Alberdi: 2021–2023
- Rosario Botton Girón: 2023–present

== See also ==
- Ibero-American Exposition of 1929
- Peruvian pavilion, Paris
