= Teatro Lope de Vega (Seville) =

Lope de Vega Theatre
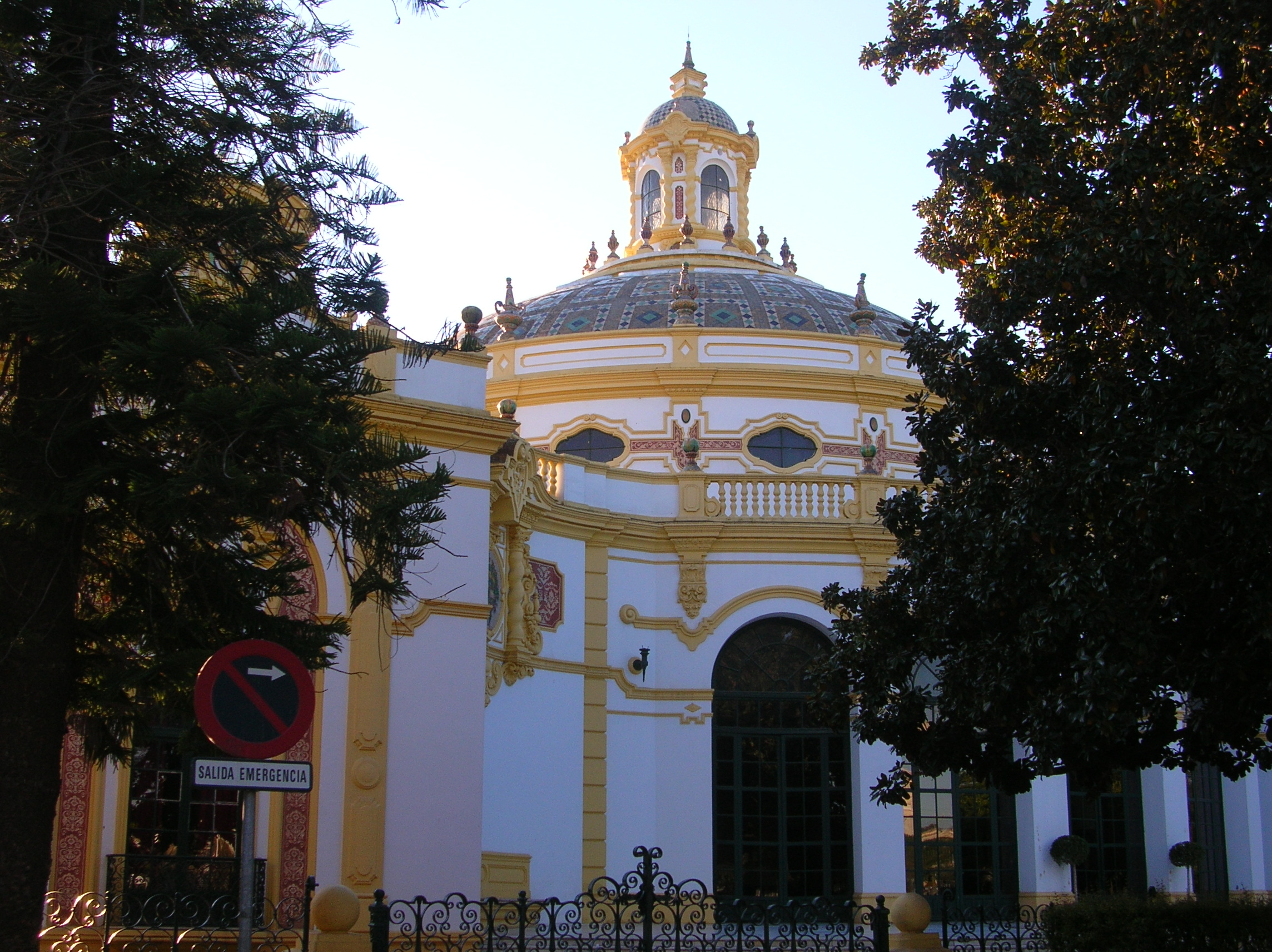
- Exhibition Casino, theatre to the left

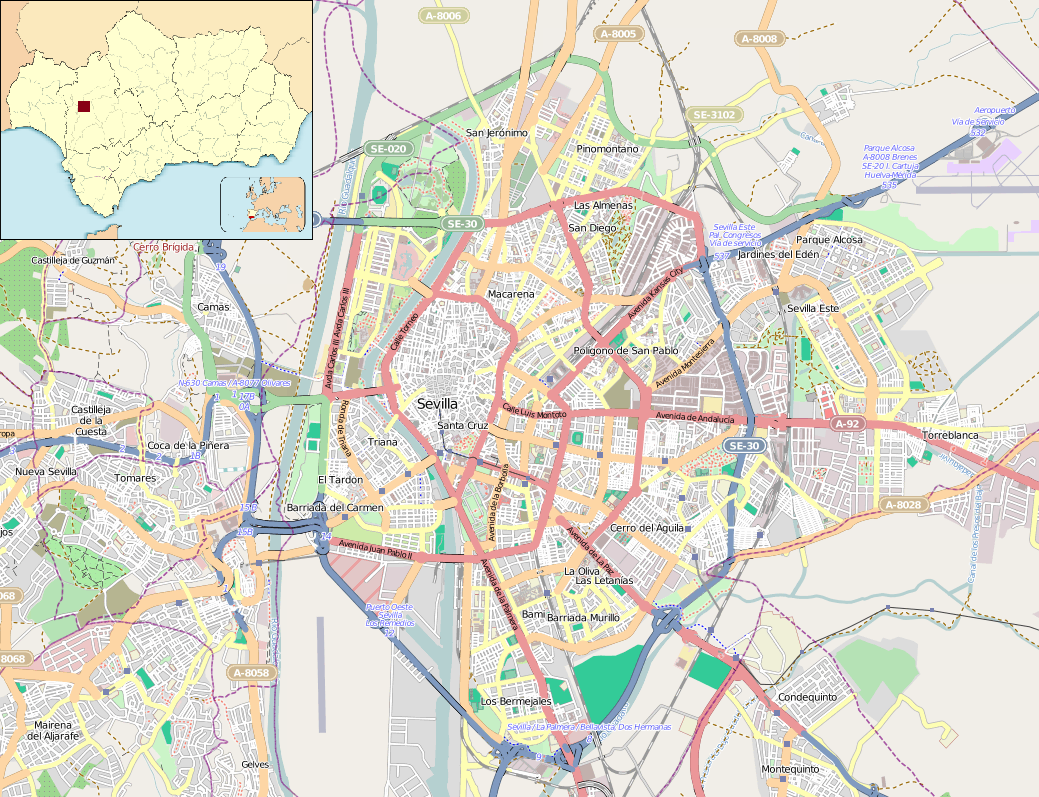
- Location within Seville
- Address: Seville
- Coordinates: 37.378823°N 5.990792°W

Construction
- Opened: 1929

Website
- www.teatrolopedevega.org/

The Lope de Vega Theatre (Spanish: Teatro Lope de Vega) is a Baroque Revival theatre that was built for the Ibero-American Exposition of 1929 in Seville, Spain, in the same building as the Exhibition Casino. It stands on the Avenida Maria Luisa street near the Maria Luisa Park just north of the Pavilion of Peru. The theater is named after the famous 16th-century Spanish playwright Lope de Vega. After the exposition the theatre had a mixed history. It suffered damage from fire and flood. At times it was closed and at times was partially restored and reopened. The building has been used as a hospital and as a trade show venue. Following its most recent renovation the theatre has become one of Seville's most important centres for cultural events.

== Construction ==
The Pabellón de Sevilla (Pavilion of Seville) housing the theatre and casino was designed by the young architect Vicente Traver y Tomás.

He chose a Baroque style that reflected Levantine influences. Elements of Baroque architecture were used in the physical structure as well as in the ornamentation. The theatre hall was fronted by the exhibition casino, which is roofed by a dome decorated in ceramics. The hall was laid out according to the canons of Italian opera, with two wings and 1,025 seats, and was one of the most modern theaters in Spain in its day. The decor by Martínez del Cid y Zaragoza was dominated by red, with fine details in gold and ivory decorating the roof and railings, and with the door and furniture painted green.

Construction of the 4,600 square metres (50,000 sq ft) theatre took just two years and included installation of an automatic electric generator which often failed, interrupting the performances. The cost was 1.2 million pesetas, a huge amount at the time. The theater was inaugurated on 30 March 1929 with a comedy by Martinez Serra entitled The Blind Heart (El Corazón Ciego). During the exhibition the building was illuminated, like other buildings of the exhibition, with powerful external spotlights that enhanced the attractive appearance of the hall.

== Later history ==
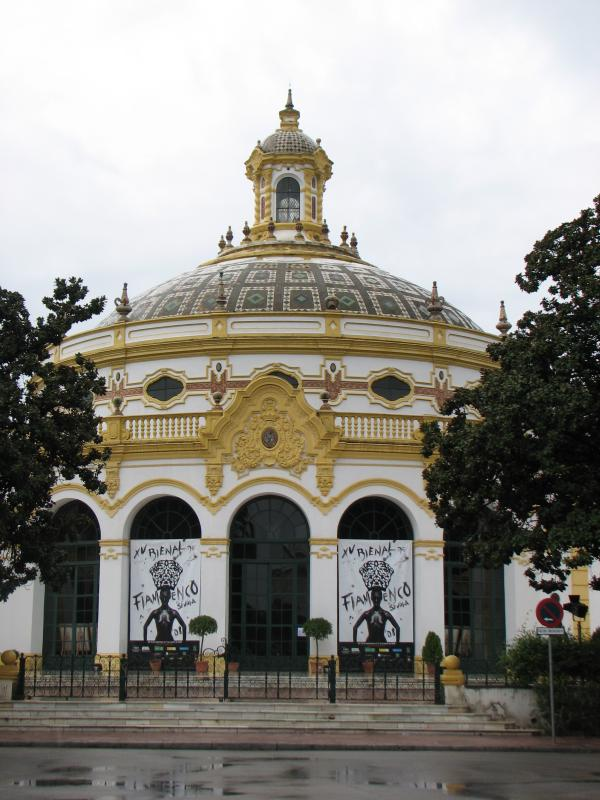
September 2008. The entrance through the casino to the theatre, with posters for a Flamenco show.

After the exhibition, the theatre had ups and downs, competing with cinemas and football. It was closed for a while, then re-opened as the Municipal Theatre Lope de Vega in 1936. The event was celebrated with a dance orchestra in the terrace beside the casino. The new opening did not last long. During the Civil War (1936–1939) the casino became a hospital, with the walls freshly painted white. A fire in the theater destroyed the central chandelier and all the seats. Also, the Guadalquivir river overflowed to flood the pit.

After the return of peace, in October 1939 the city council decided to organise a season of opera. They cleaned the theatre, repaired the roof and installed indirect lighting. The theatre came back into use for opera and operetta, and was also used by amateur theatre groups and even schools. In 1961, renewed flooding again caused damage to the pit, and fresh renovations were required. In 1977 the theatre was assigned to the Ministry of Culture, and after a facelift became the National Theatre of Lope de Vega Sevilla. The theatre was used for a trade show in 1985. It hosted the OTI Festival 1985 and the World Chess Championship 1987.

== Recent years ==
The theatre was returned to the city of Seville in 1985, and over a two-year period the architect Victor Perez Escolano made significant alterations, returning the theatre to its original design, although this limited the number of spectators to 749. The first performance after the reopening in February 1988 was a concert by the London Philharmonic Orchestra. From then on, the theatre has put on more than 180 performances every year to over 100,000 spectators. The theatre today stages classical and modern plays and concerts, and flamenco shows. It is a venue for the Flamenco Biennale of Seville, which is held on even-numbered years, and is among the most important theatres in Spain. As of January 2009 further repairs were needed, especially to the casino dome which had tiles missing and was leaking.

== Exhibitions ==
- Body Worlds: Animal Inside Out - One of Gunther von Hagens's Body Worlds exhibition series that features plastinated animal sculptures of a gorilla, a giraffe, an elephant, a caribou, a bactrian camel, a horse, a cow, a bull, a yak, a cheetah, a tiger, a mako shark, a great white shark holding a sea lion in his mouth, a squid, an octopus, a sheep, a goat, a lion pouncing on an oryx from behind, and many others.

== Gallery ==
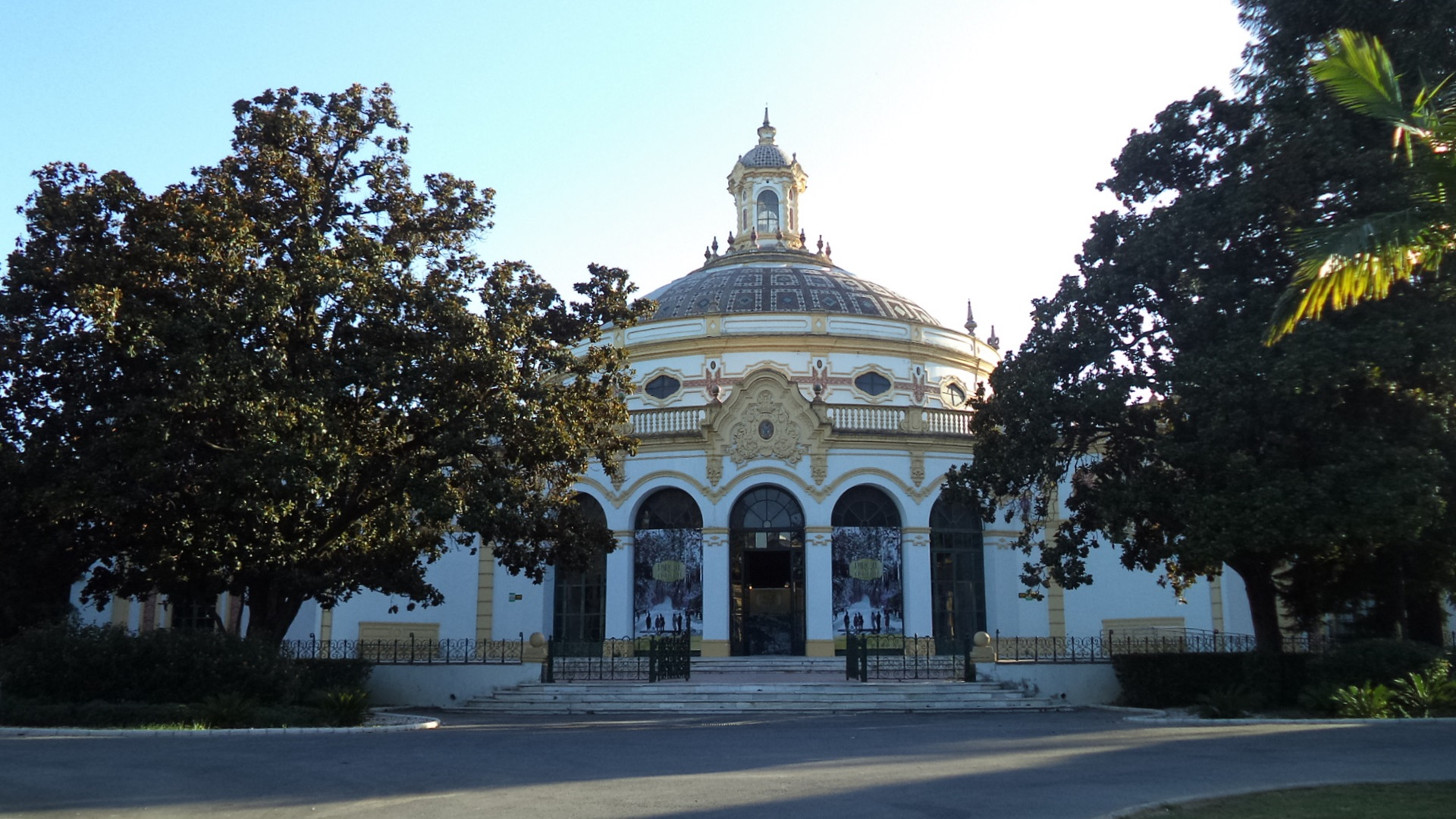
One entrance of the pavillon, the entrance leads through the Casino of the building

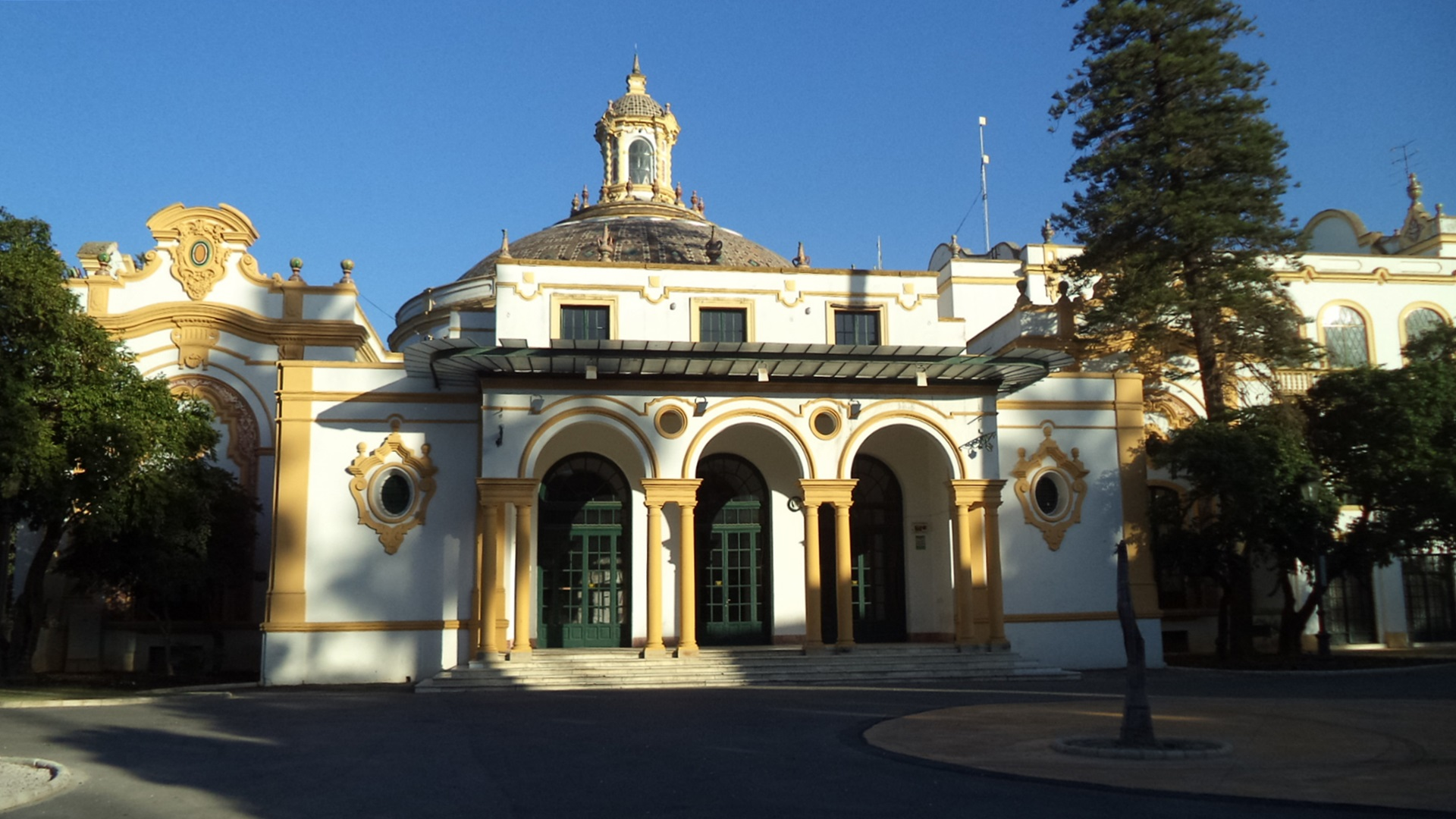
North facade of the building

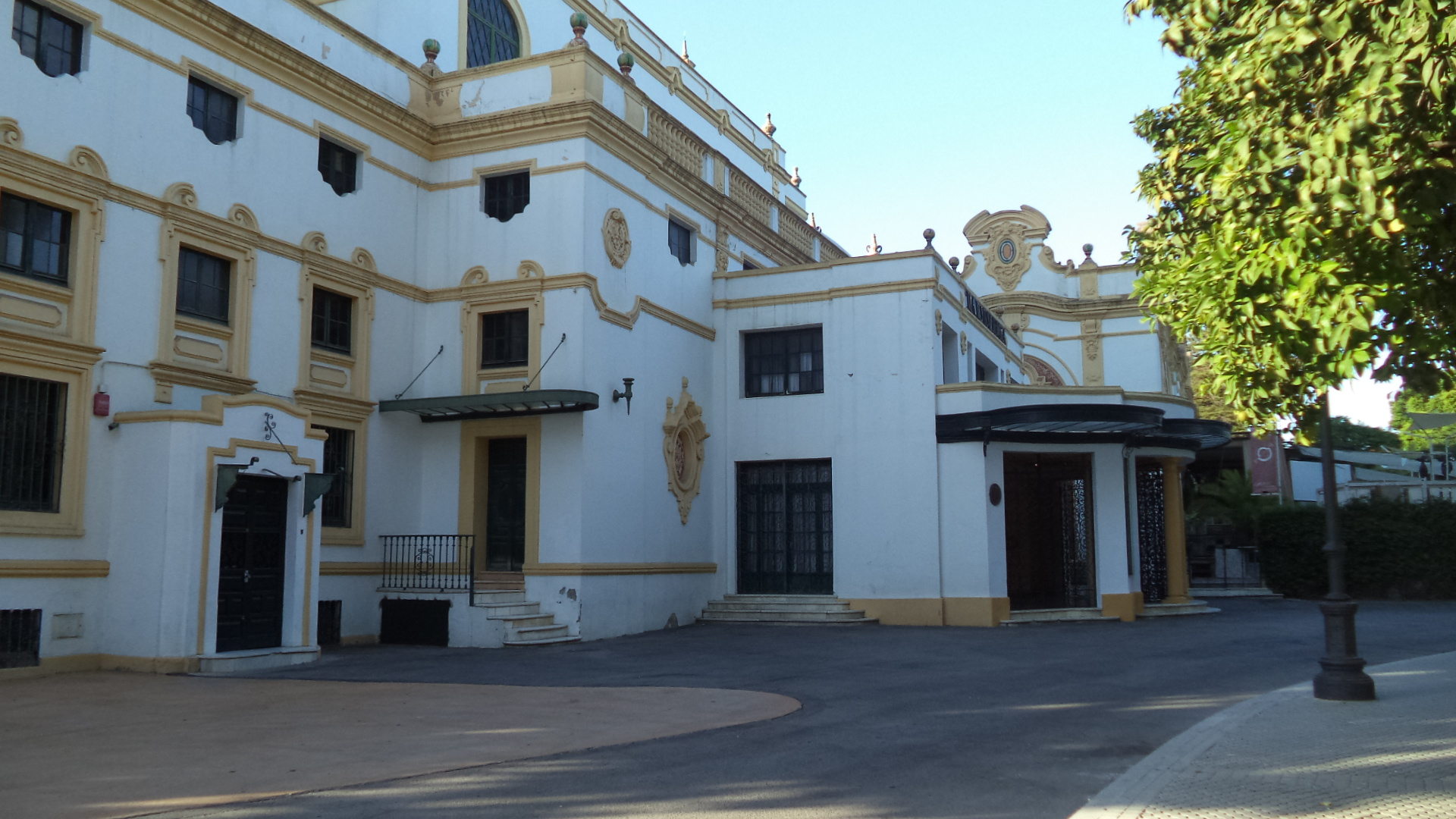
Lope de Vega Theatre
