= Vicente Traver y Tomás =

Spanish architect

- Born: 23 September 1888; Castellón de la Plana
- Died: November 15, 1966 (aged 78)
- Occupation: Architect
- Known for: Buildings designed for the Ibero-American Exposition of 1929

Vicente Traver y Tomás (23 September 1888 – 15 November 1966) was a Spanish architect. His most notable works were constructed in Seville between 1915 and 1933.

== Biography ==
Vicente Traver y Tomás was born in Castellón de la Plana on 23 September 1888. His secondary education was at the Santa Clara Institute in his home town. He studied as an architect in Madrid, qualifying in 1912.

After completing his studies he practiced as an architect in Seville, where he remained until 1933. In 1913–15 he designed low-income housing for the city in the Real Patronato de Casas Baratas. In 1926 Traver replaced Aníbal González as chief architect and designer for the Ibero-American Exposition of 1929.

After the Second Spanish Republic was declared, in 1933 he moved back to Castellón. In April 1939, at the end of civil war, he was appointed mayor of the city and remained in office until 1942.

That year he became architect of the Diocese of Alicante.

== Works ==
Vicente Traver created his most important works in the city of Seville:

- Joint Royal Trust houses for low-cost housing of the future (1915)
- Miguel Garcia House Longoria Plaza Nueva, street corner Badajoz (1917-1920)
- Project for expansion of the Basilica of Our Lady of the Forsaken, never carried out due to the start of the Spanish Civil War and the recent discovery of Roman ruins in the Almoina square beside the building.
- Spanish Provident Building on Calle Orfila, the current headquarters of the Ateneo de Sevilla (1923).
- Corpus Christi Church on Avenida de la Palmera (1929-1933)

At the Ibero-American Exposition of 1929 Traver was responsible for the exhibition's Casino and the Teatro Lope de Vega. He also helped design the Plaza de España. Other works included the old warehouses of the Spanish Credit Bank, today converted into a hotel at Avenida Manuel Siurot (1927-1929), the Seminary of Valencia and the Diocesan Seminary of the Assumption of Tortosa, opened in 1951, and the neo-Romanesque chapel of San Liborio (Fuente En-Segures, Benassal).

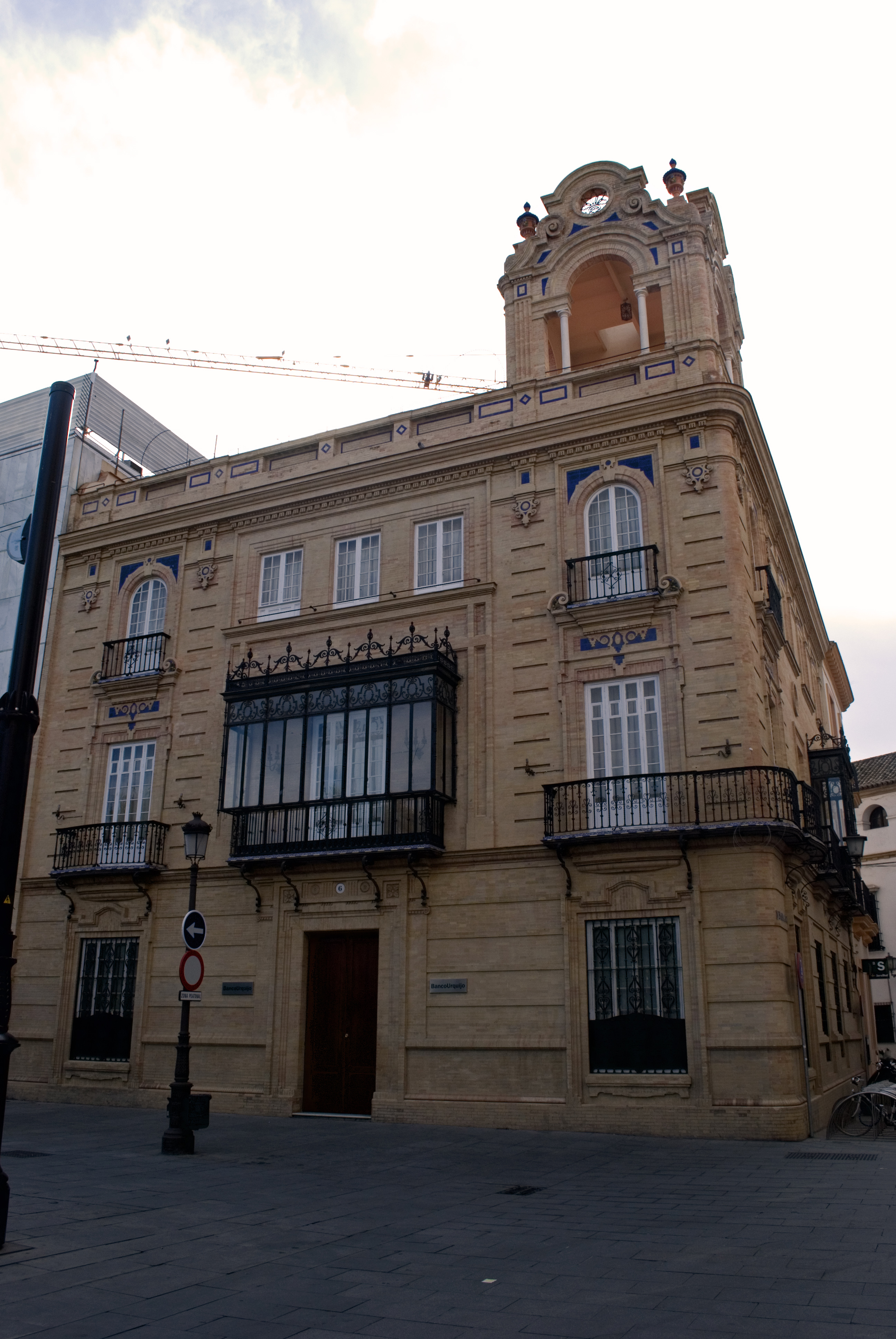
Facade of the Casa Longoria at the Plaza Nueva, designed by Vicente Traver and built between 1917 and 1920.

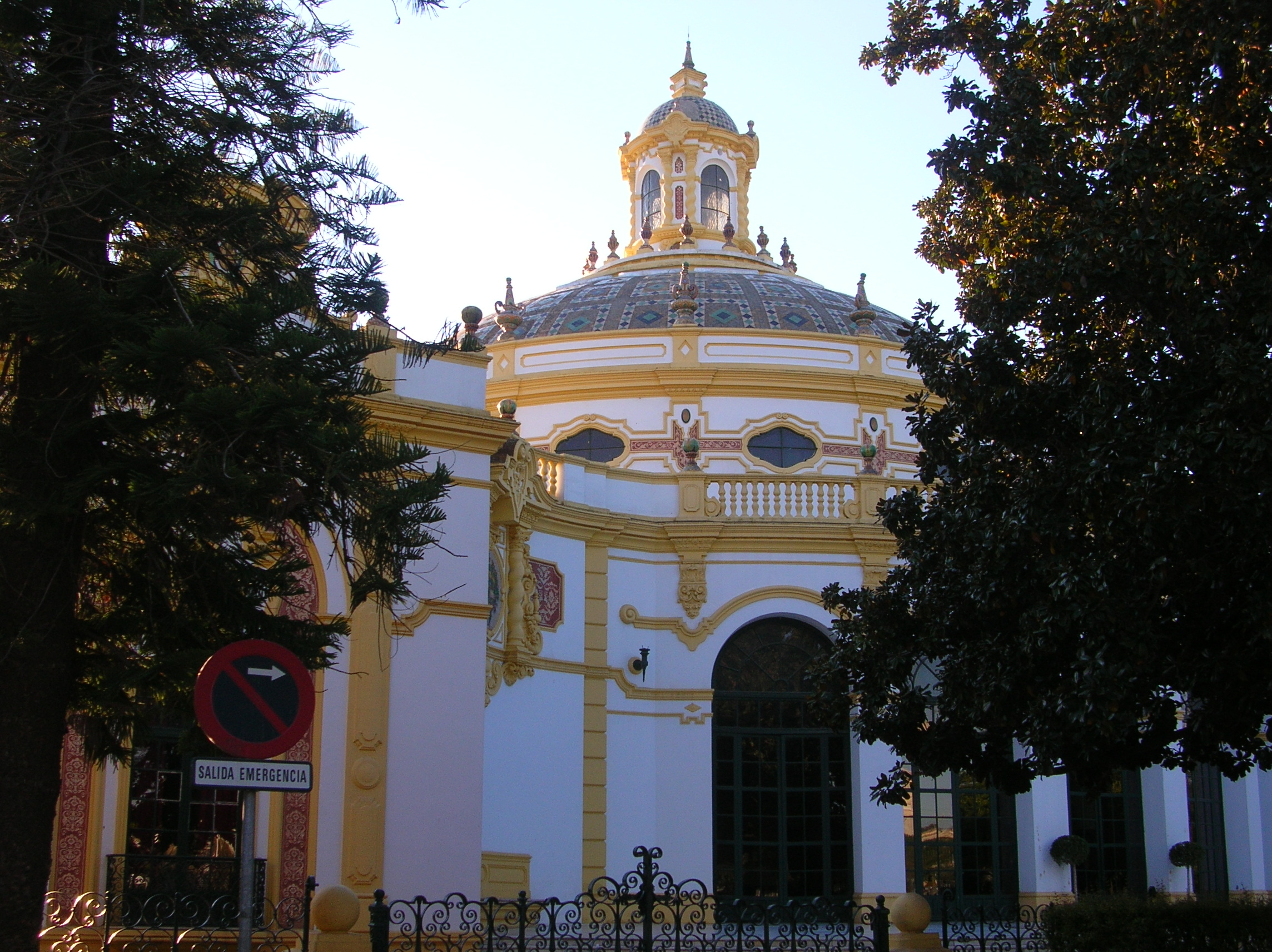
Exposition Casino (1929) Sevilla. Designed by Vicente Traver.

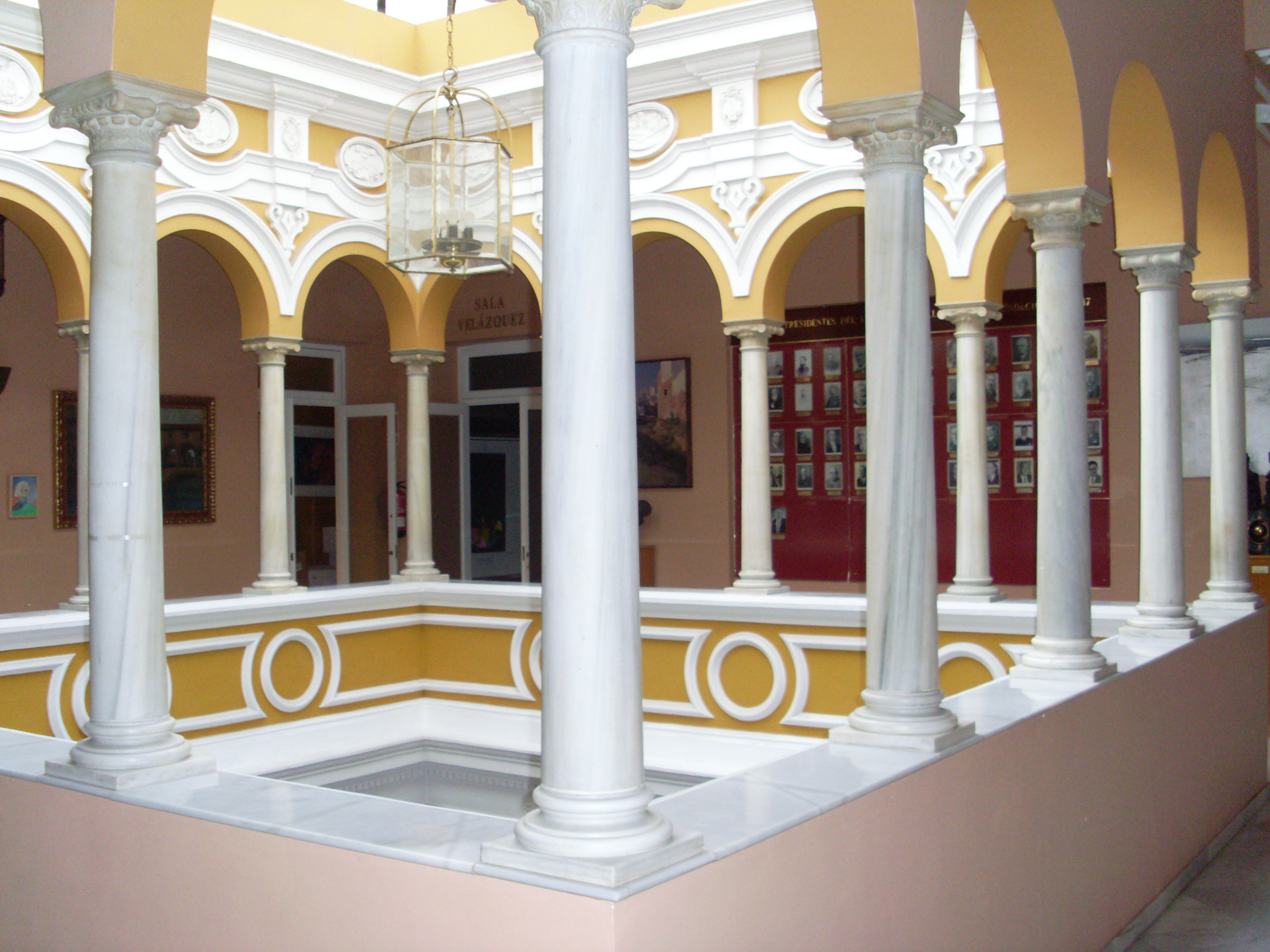
Courtyward of the Ateneo de Sevilla

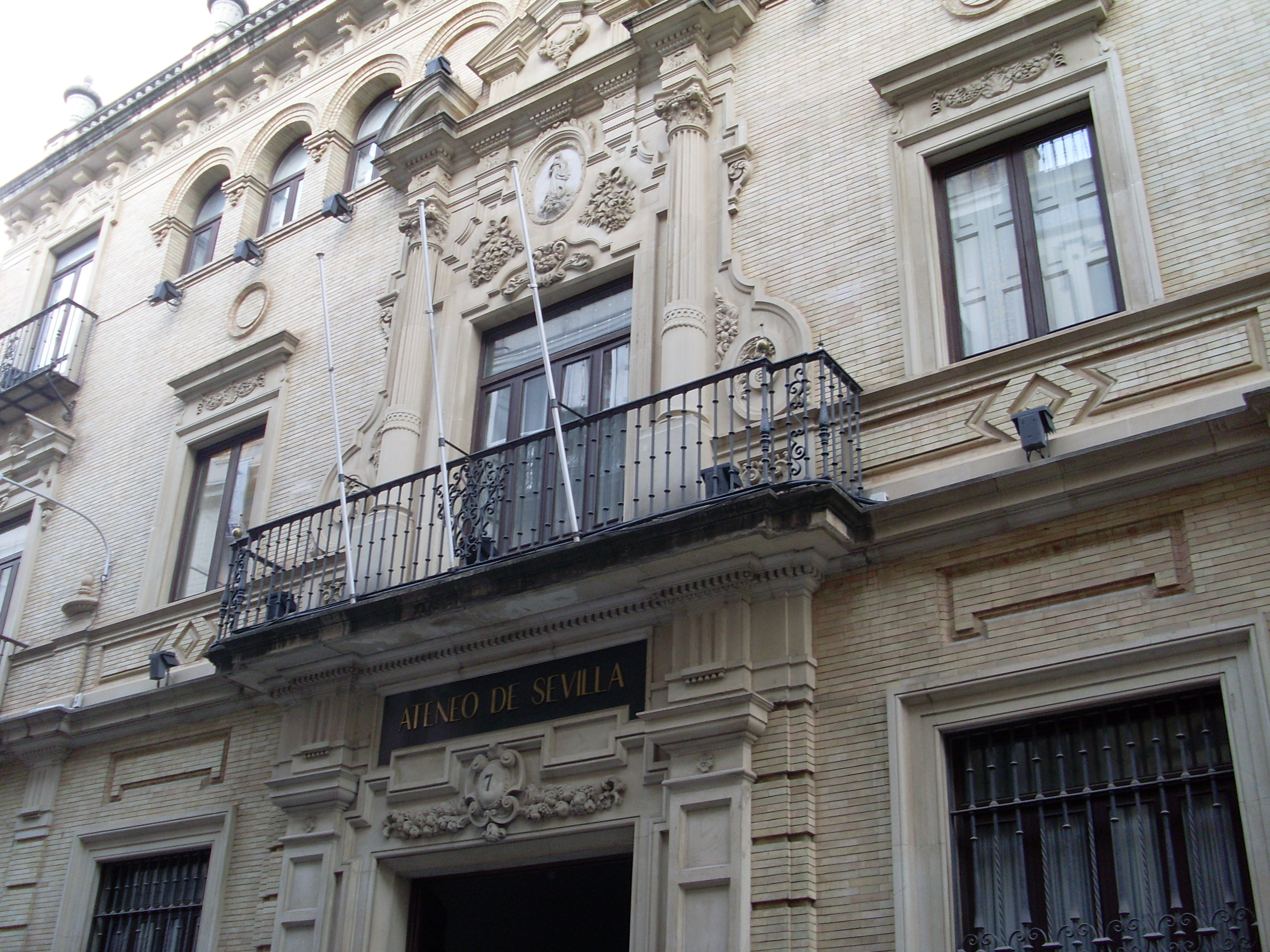
Main façade, Ateneo de Sevilla

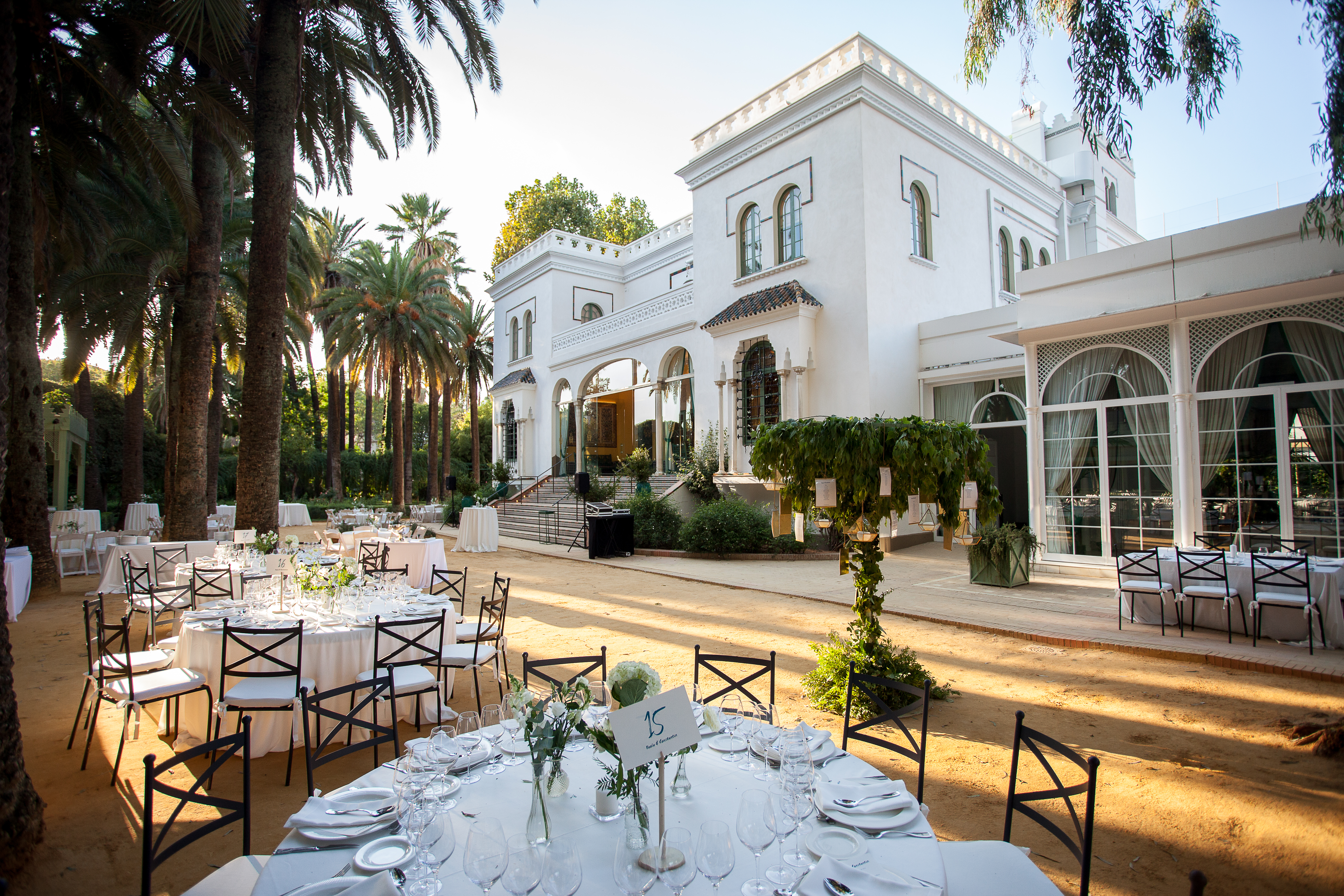
Villa Luisa, former house of Don Herman Bemberg, now open for private & corporate events under the family management. Manuel Siurot 1. Designed by Vicente Traver.

== Sources ==
- "Cuando la Plaza Nueva era Casa Grande", ABC (España) (in Spanish), 2006-05-30
- Sevilla siglo XX: Traver (in Spanish), 2009-01-30
- Vicente Traver Tomás, Alcalde, arquitecto y humanista (PDF) (in Spanish), archived from the original (PDF) on 2023-05-28
- "Vicente Traver y Tomás: el arquitecto olvidado", dedalocultura.com (in Spanish), 2014-03-24
