= La Casa de la Ciencia =

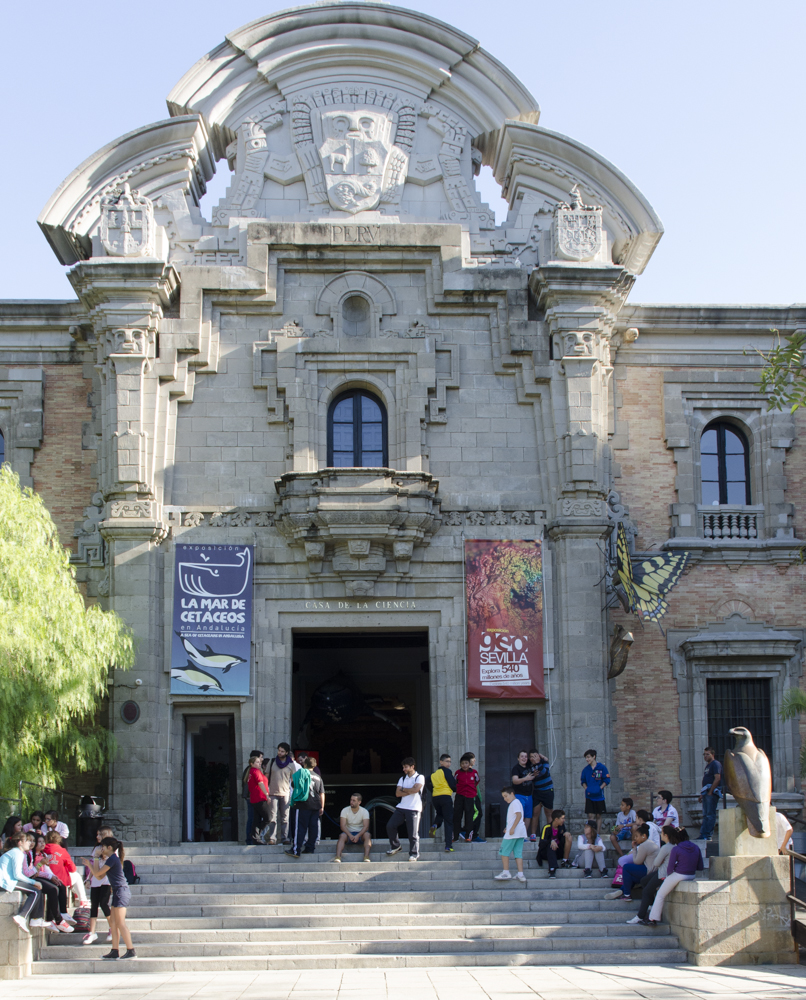
- Peruvian Pavilion of the Ibero-American Exposition of 1929
- Established: 2008 (building built in 1929)
- Location: Seville, Spain
- Coordinates: 37.377694°N 5.991198°E
- Type: Science museum
- Website: www.casadelaciencia.csic.es

La Casa de la Ciencia (The House of Science) in the city of Seville, Spain is a centre for popularizing science.

Along with a museum, the building houses the Andalusian headquarters of the Spanish National Research Council (CSIC). CSIC is the largest public institution devoted to research in Spain, and the third largest in Europe. The building was opened to the public in 2008, with the goal of sharing knowledge acquired through scientific research. La Casa de la Ciencia aims to be a bridge between the scientific research community and the public, sharing contemporary scientific research and information on environmental issues. The museum achieves these goals by putting on various types of events, including exhibitions, conferences, seminars and workshops. The museum contains three permanent exhibits, one temporary exhibit and a planetarium.

== History ==
The museum is housed in the Peruvian pavilion (Pabellón de Perú), a building of great beauty that was built in the Maria Luisa Park for the Ibero-American Exposition of 1929. In addition to being home to the offices of the Consejo Superior de Investigaciones Científicas en Sevilla (CSIC), the building also houses the Peruvian consulate. For twenty years the building was the headquarters of the Biological Station of Doñana and in April 2008 the city council of Seville provided a grant to renovate the building to create La Casa de la Ciencia. In April 2008 the city council of Seville provided a grant to renovate the building to create La Casa de la Cienca.

== Building ==
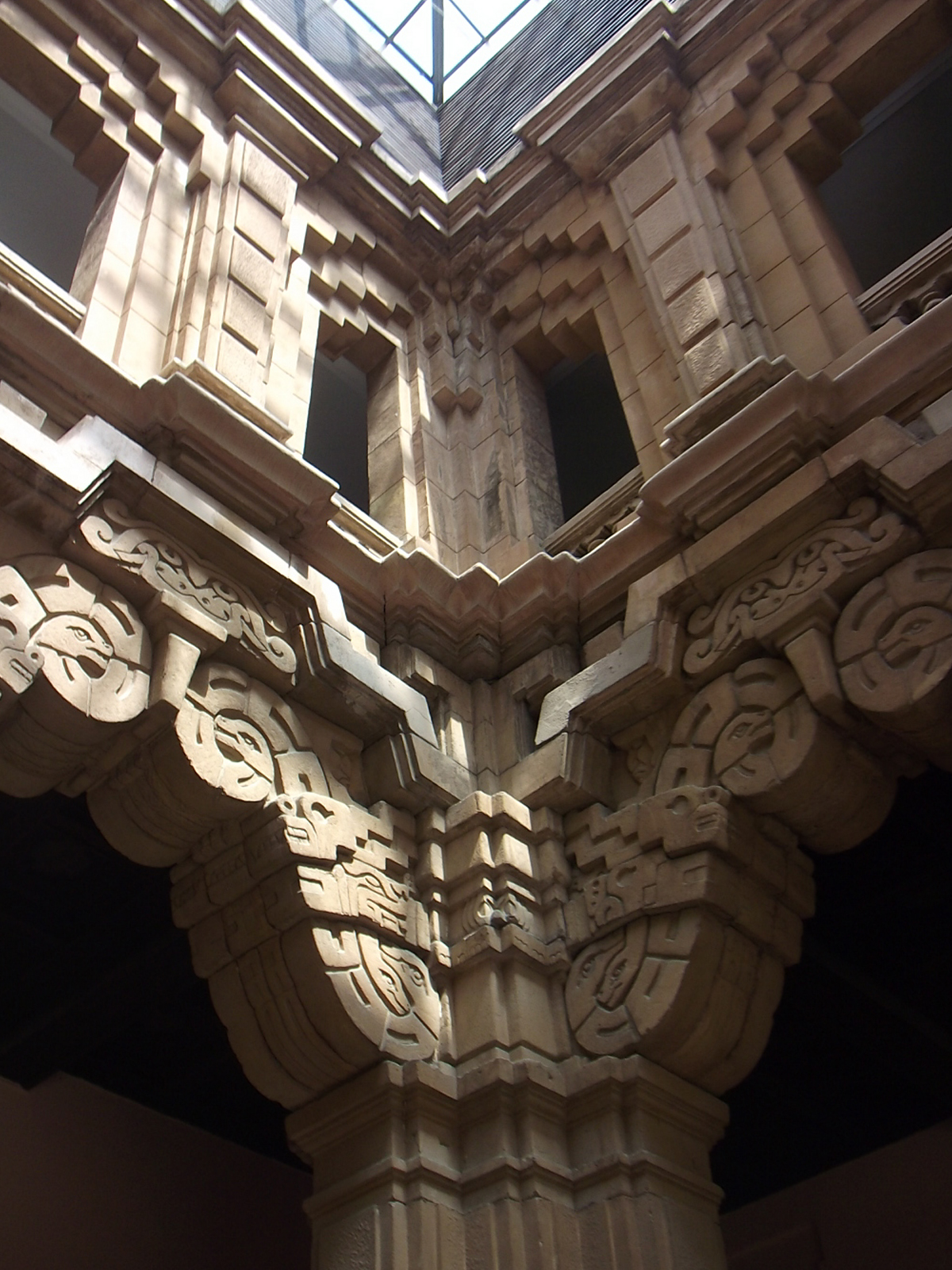
Museum interior

The building was designed by the renowned architect Manuel Piqueras Cotolí (1885 – 1937). Cotoli was born in Lucena, Córdoba but moved to Peru to study and became known for his buildings which blended indigenous and colonial architecture. These buildings include the Escuela Nacional Superior Autónoma de Bellas Artes, Pizarro´s Tomb in the Cathedral of Lima, and the Archbishop's Palace. The blending of architectural styles is easily visible from the outside of La Casa de la Ciencia, and many parts of the building share similarities with Cotoli’s Peruvian works.

A part of the building holds the Consulate General of Peru in Seville. In July 2008 the Peruvian ambassador to Spain signed a 75-year renewal of the assignment by the City of Seville of the Pavilion of Peru to the Republic of Peru and to the CSIC. The CSIC had undertaken to provide a 3,000 square metres (32,000 sq ft) exhibition space open to the public dedicated to the extension of science in Andalusia.

== Exterior ==
The building lies on the Avenida Maria Luisa, noted for the Queen's sewing box (Costurero de la Reina), a unique building that takes the form of a small hexagonal castle with turrets at the corners, and the oldest building in Seville in the neomudéjar style. It is between the Seville Public Library, inaugurated in 1999 by the Infanta Elena, Duchess of Lugo, and the Teatro Lope de Vega Sevilla, a small baroque-style theatre that was also built for the exhibition. On one side of the building is the Guadalquivir river and on the other, Parque Maria Luisa and Plaza de España (Seville).

== Features ==
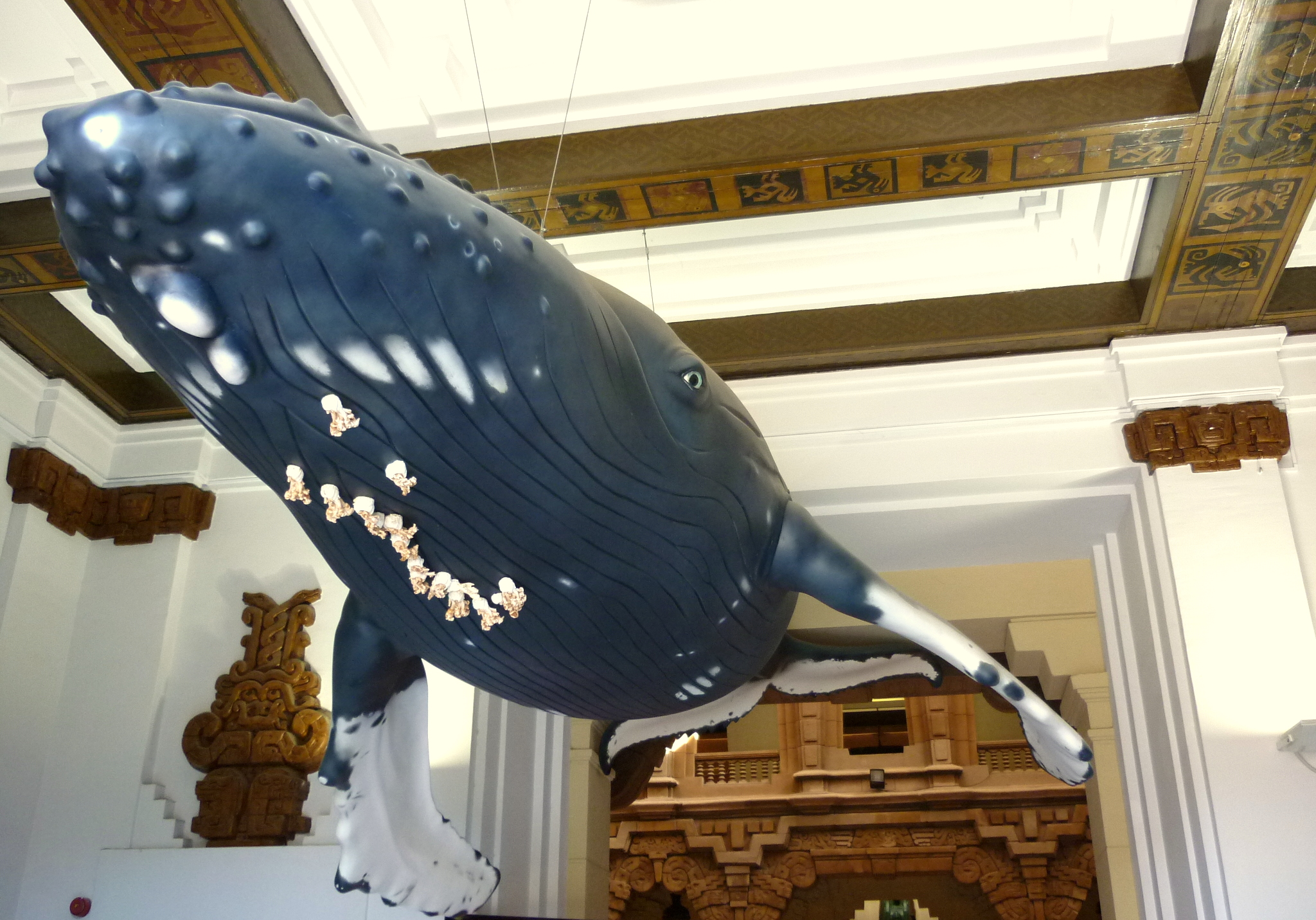
Whale hanging in the entrance to the museum

The museum currently has three permanent exhibits open to the public, which showcase the flora, fauna and minerals of the region: Invertebrates of Andalusia, Geology of Seville, and A Sea of Cetaceans in Andalusia. The museum also contains Seville's only planetarium.

Notable features include a clepsydra (Water clock) and an ecosphere (aquarium).

Peter O'Toole's opening scene in Lawrence of Arabia was filmed in basement of the building, now used for meetings by CSIC.

== See also ==
- List of science centers
