= Ibero-American Exposition of 1929 =

World's fair held in Seville, Spain

1929 Seville
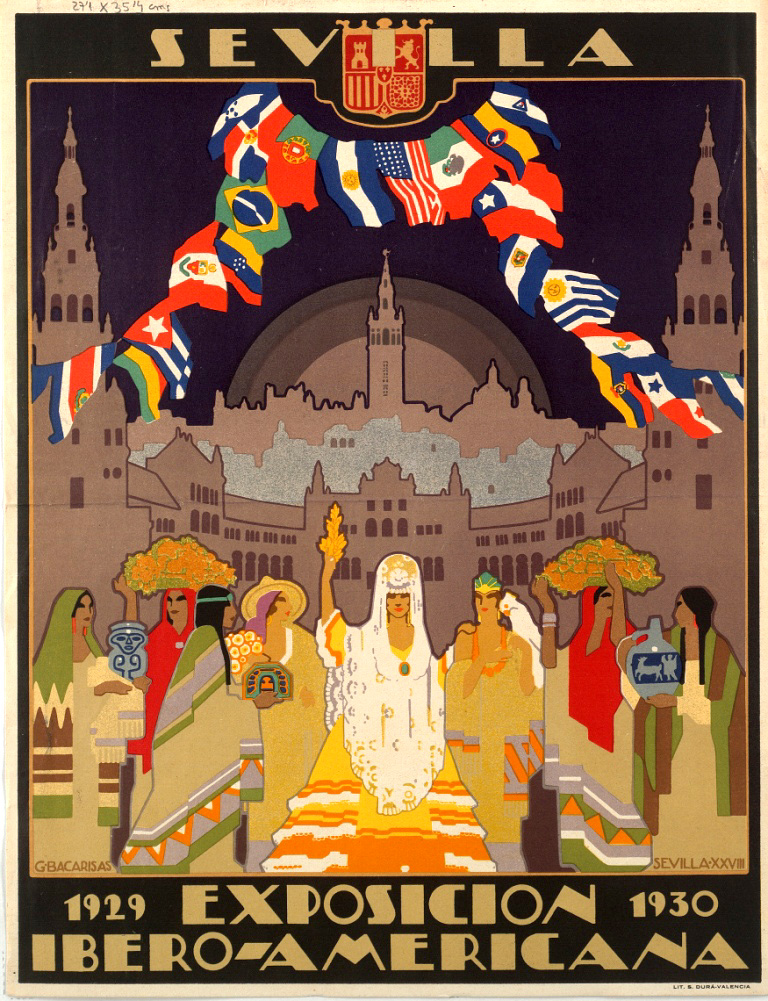
- Poster

Overview
- BIE-class: Universal exposition
- Category: Historical Expo
- Name: Exposición Ibero-Americana (Spanish); Exposição Ibero-Americana (Portuguese)
- Area: 69 hectares (170 acres)

Participant(s)
- Countries: 18

Location
- Country: Spain
- City: Seville
- Venue: Maria Luisa Park

Timeline
- Opening: 9 May 1929
- Closure: 21 June 1930

Universal expositions
- Previous: Panama–Pacific International Exposition in San Francisco
- Next: Century of Progress in Chicago

Simultaneous
- Universal: 1929 Barcelona International Exposition

The Ibero-American Exposition of 1929 (Spanish: Exposición iberoamericana de 1929; Portuguese: Exposição Ibero-Americana de 1929) was a world's fair held in Seville, Spain, from 9 May 1929 until 21 June 1930. Countries in attendance of the exposition included: Portugal, the United States, Brazil, Uruguay, Mexico, Peru, Argentina, Chile, Colombia, Cuba, Venezuela, the Dominican Republic, Bolivia, Panama, El Salvador, Costa Rica, and Ecuador. Each Spanish region and each of the provinces of Andalusia were also represented.

General Miguel Primo de Rivera, then Prime Minister of Spain, gave the opening address. Primo de Rivera allowed the Spanish King Alfonso XIII to give the final words and officially open the exposition. The purpose of the exposition was to improve relations between Spain and the countries in attendance, all of which have historical ties with Spain through either colonisation (parts of Spanish America and the United States) or political union (Portugal and Brazil). Other countries were represented at the International section in Barcelona.

== Background ==
Map of the exhibition.

The exposition was smaller in scale than the International Exposition held in Barcelona during that same year, but it was not lacking in style. The city of Seville had prepared for the Exposition over the course of 19 years. The exhibition's buildings were constructed in María Luisa Park along the Guadalquivir River. A majority of the buildings were built to remain permanent after the closing of the exposition.

Many of the buildings built to represent the foreign countries participating in the event, including that of the United States, were to be used as consulates after the closing of the exhibits. By the opening of the exposition all of the buildings were complete, although many were no longer new. Not long before the opening of the Exposition, the Spanish government also began a modernization of the city in order to prepare for the expected crowds by erecting new hotels and widening the medieval streets to allow for the movement of automobiles.

== Pavilions and exhibits ==
=== Spain ===
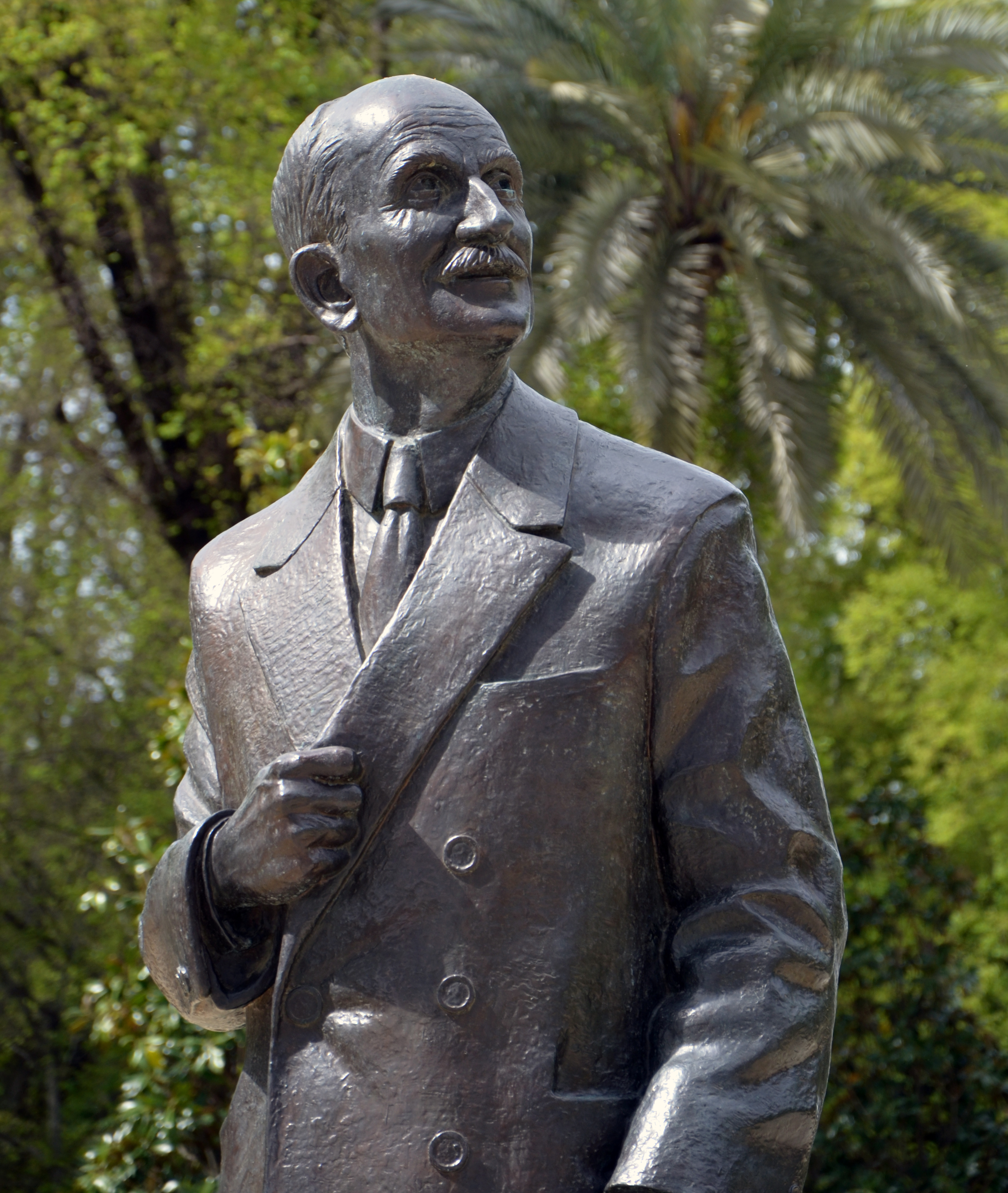
Statue of Aníbal González

Spain spent a large amount of money in developing its exhibits for the fair and constructed elaborate buildings to hold them. The exhibits were designed to show the social and economic progress of Spain as well as expressing its culture.

Spanish architect Aníbal González Álvarez-Ossorio designed the largest and most famous of the buildings, which surrounded the Plaza de España. The largest of the exhibits housed in this building was located in the Hall of the Discovery of America (Spanish: Salón del Descubrimento de América). The building contained documents, maps, and other objects related to Christopher Columbus' discovery of the Americas, including a set of 120 letters and manuscript that had belonged to him, the last testament of Hernán Cortés, and detailed dioramas of historic moments. An exact replica of the Santa María, Columbus's ship, complete with a costumed crew, floated on the Guadalquivir River.

The cities of Spain contributed structures designed to reflect their unique cultures to be placed in the "Pavilions of the Spanish regions" (Spanish: Pabellones de las regiones españolas). Spain's exhibits also included a large collection of art located in the Palacio Mudéjar ("Mudéjar art palace"), Palacio Renacimiento ("Renaissance palace"), and the Palacio de la Casa Real ("Palace of the Royal House").

The Institute of Art from the University of Seville was moved to the Palacio Mudéjar for the duration of the exposition on the permission gained from the exposition committee by Count Columbi. The committee also set aside funds from their budget to purchase materials for the Institute.

In total, Spain built 11 pavilions and two additional buildings.

- Domecq pavilion: designed by Aurelio Gómez Millán.
- Mudéjar pavilion: designed by Aníbal González.
- Renaissance pavilion: designed by Aníbal González.
- Royal pavilion: designed by Aníbal González.
- Seville pavilion: currently functions as a theatre.
- Information pavilion: currently functions as La Raza restaurant.
- Press pavilion: designed by Vicente Traver y Tomás.
- Moroccan pavilion: designed by José Gutiérrez Lescura.
- Telephone pavilion: designed by Juan Talavera y Heredia.
- Ministry of Navy pavilion: designed by Vicente Traver y Tomás.
- Hotel Alfonso XIII: designed by José Espiau y Muñoz and Francisco Urcola Lazcanotegui.
- Galerías Americanas: currently part of the port.
- Regional pavilions: Only two vestiges of these pavilions have been preserved; the Basque pavilion, which is currently the Regional Oncology Center of the Duques del Infantado hospital, and a tower of the Córdoba pavilion on Reina Mercedes Avenue.

=== Iberian America ===
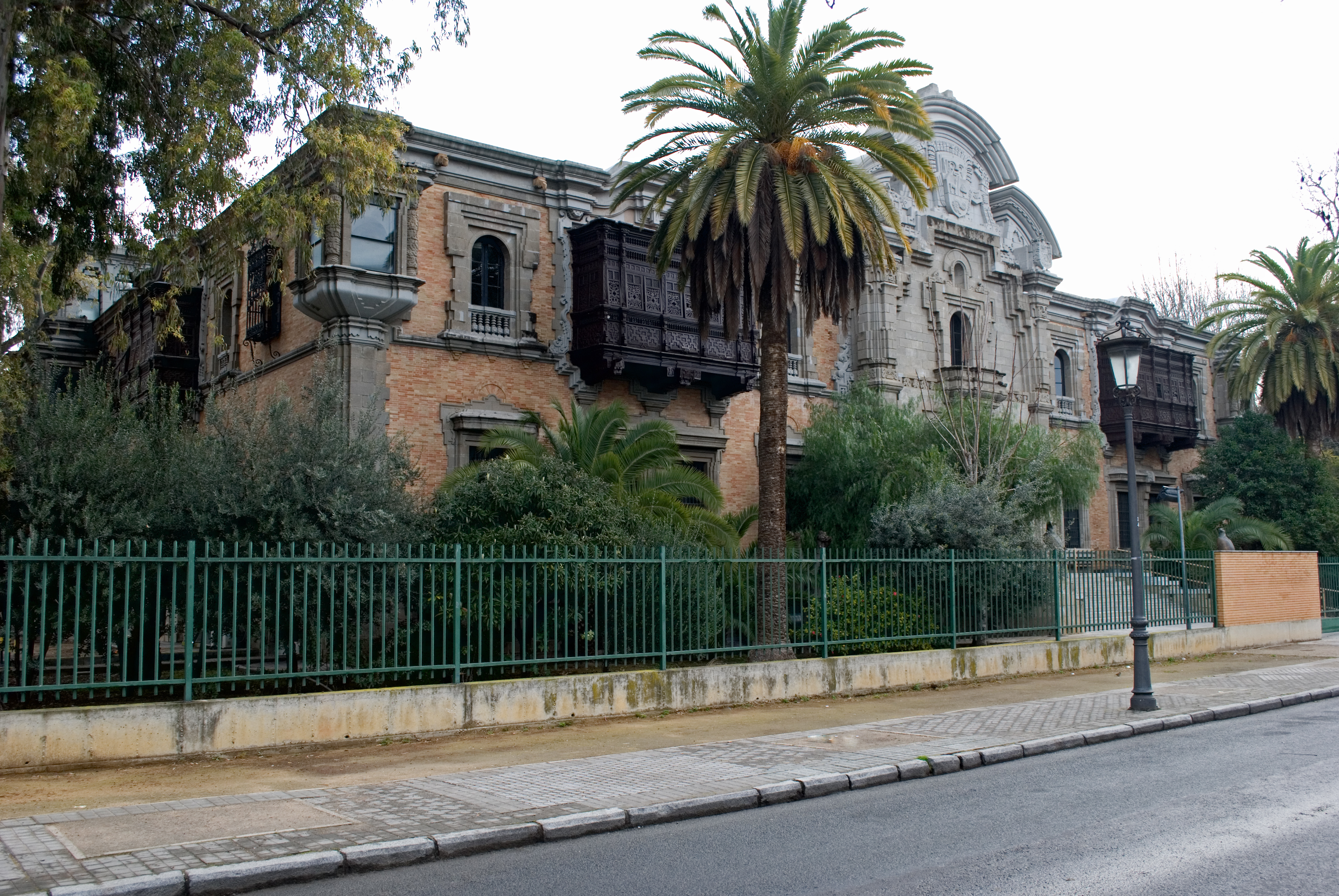
The former pavilion of Peru in 2009.

Of the Iberian American nations in attendance of the exposition, 10 constructed pavilions to display their exhibits. Other nations, including Bolivia, Panama, El Salvador, Costa Rica, and Ecuador displayed their native products in the Commercial galleries of the Americas (Spanish: Galerías comerciales americanas).

- Argentina: The Argentine pavilion was designed by architect Martin Noel, and included a movie theatre and displays focusing on Argentinean industries and products.
- Brazil: The Brazilian pavilion contained a coffee cultivation exhibit complete with panoramas and models illustrating the different phases of cultivation. Architect Pedro Paulo Bernardes Bastos designed the pavilion, which also included a coffee bar.
- Chile: The Chilean pavilion was the work of architect Juan Martínez Gutiérrez, who designed the three-story building. The exhibits included displays of Chilean industries, including detailed replicas of a nitrate mine and a copper plant, Araucanian arts and crafts, and galleries displaying Chilean art and history.
- Colombia: The Colombian pavilion was designed by Seville architect José Granados. The pavilion included a collection of sculpture and artwork by Colombian artist Rómulo Rozo, and of Colombian emeralds, and a coffee café that demonstrated all of the steps in coffee cultivation.
- Cuba: The Cuban pavilion contributed demonstrations of the sugar and tobacco industries to the exposition in their pavilion. Murals in the building were done by painter Pastor Argudín Pedroso.
- Dominican Republic: The Pavilion of Santo Domingo was designed by Martín Gallart y Canti and included a reproduction of the Columbus's Alcázar.
- Guatemala: The Guatemalan pavilion was designed by Emilio Gómez Flores and José Granados de la Vega. The country signed up late for the exhibition and, as a result, rather than resembling a huge palace, its pavilion looks more like a school portable building with blue and white tiles on the front. The building contained exhibits relating to the resources found in Guatemala.
- Mexico: The Mexican pavilion was designed by Manuel Amábilis and included exhibits on archeology, education, and the history of Spanish accomplishments in Mexico. Students in Mexican schools prepared some of the education exhibits.
- Peru: The Peruvian pavilion was designed by architect Manuel Piqueras Cotolí, being the largest of the ten pavilions. It contained a large archeology collection consisting of three halls filled with pre-Columbian era artifacts, which were to be kept on permanent display. The pavilion also contained an agricultural exhibit filled with stuffed vicuñas, alpacas, llamas, and guanacos. The exhibit was complemented by a pack of live llamas grazing on the pavilion grounds. It currently functions as the country's consulate and as a science museum.
- Portugal: The Portuguese pavilion was designed by Carlos and Guilherme Rebelo de Andrade, and currently serves as the country's consulate.

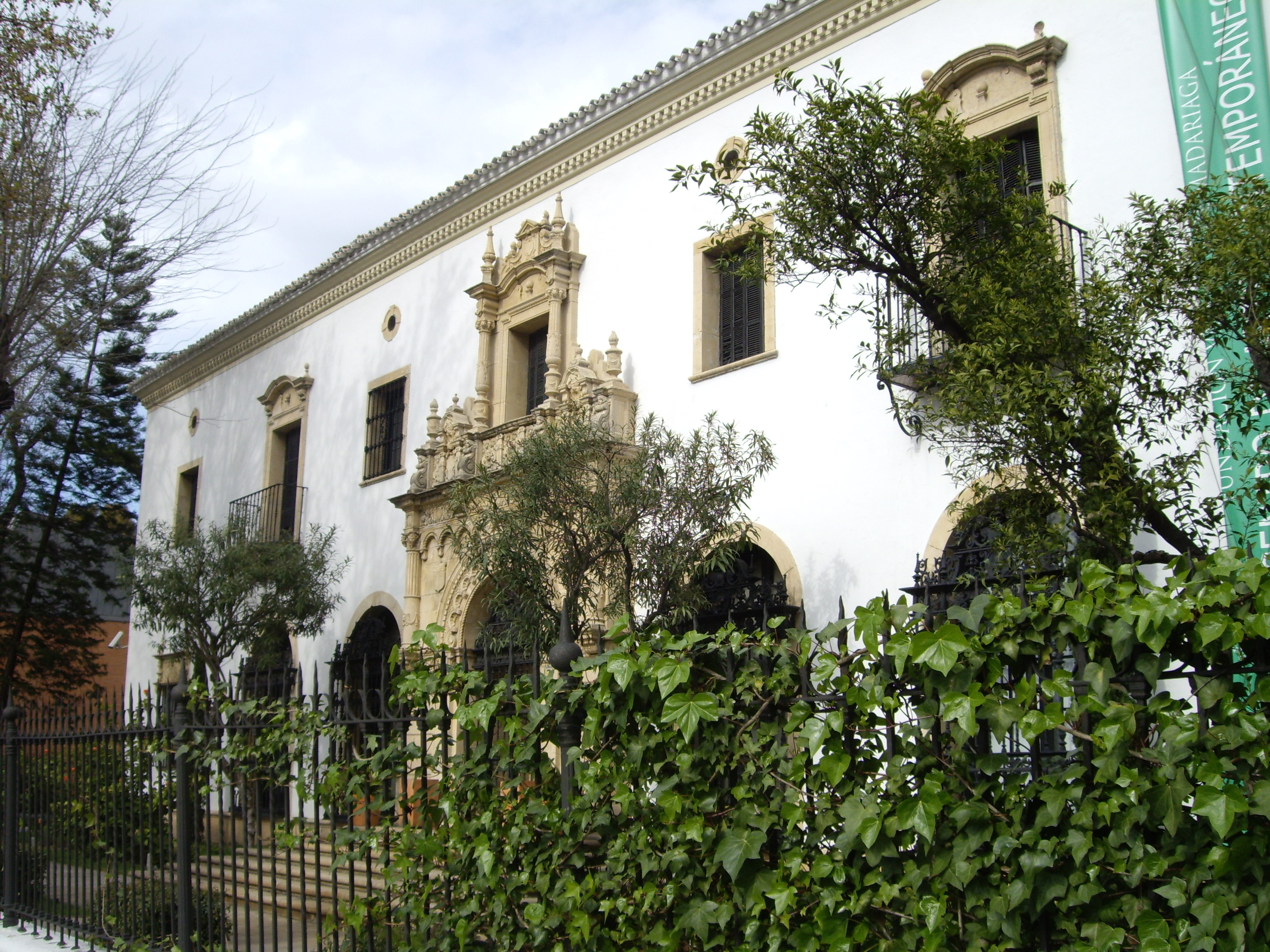
United States Pavilion (2013)

- United States: The American pavilion was designed by William Templeton Johnson. The United States' contribution to the exposition consisted of three buildings and marked the end to a several year period in which the U.S. did not construct buildings for foreign expositions. The main building was to serve as the U.S. consulate office after the closing of the exposition, and housed a menagerie of electrical appliances including oil furnaces, electric refrigerators, airplane models, and miniature wind tunnels. The other two structures housed a movie theatre and government exhibits, including contributions from the Departments of Agriculture, Treasury, and Labor, the Commission of Fine Arts, the Navy, and the Library of Congress.
- Uruguay: The Uruguayan pavilion included displays of its industrial schools, including the Institute of Agronomy and an art gallery filled with paintings and bronze sculptures.
- Venezuela: The Venezuelan pavilion was designed by Germán de Falla and also erected a pavilion containing displays of its resources.

== Legacy ==
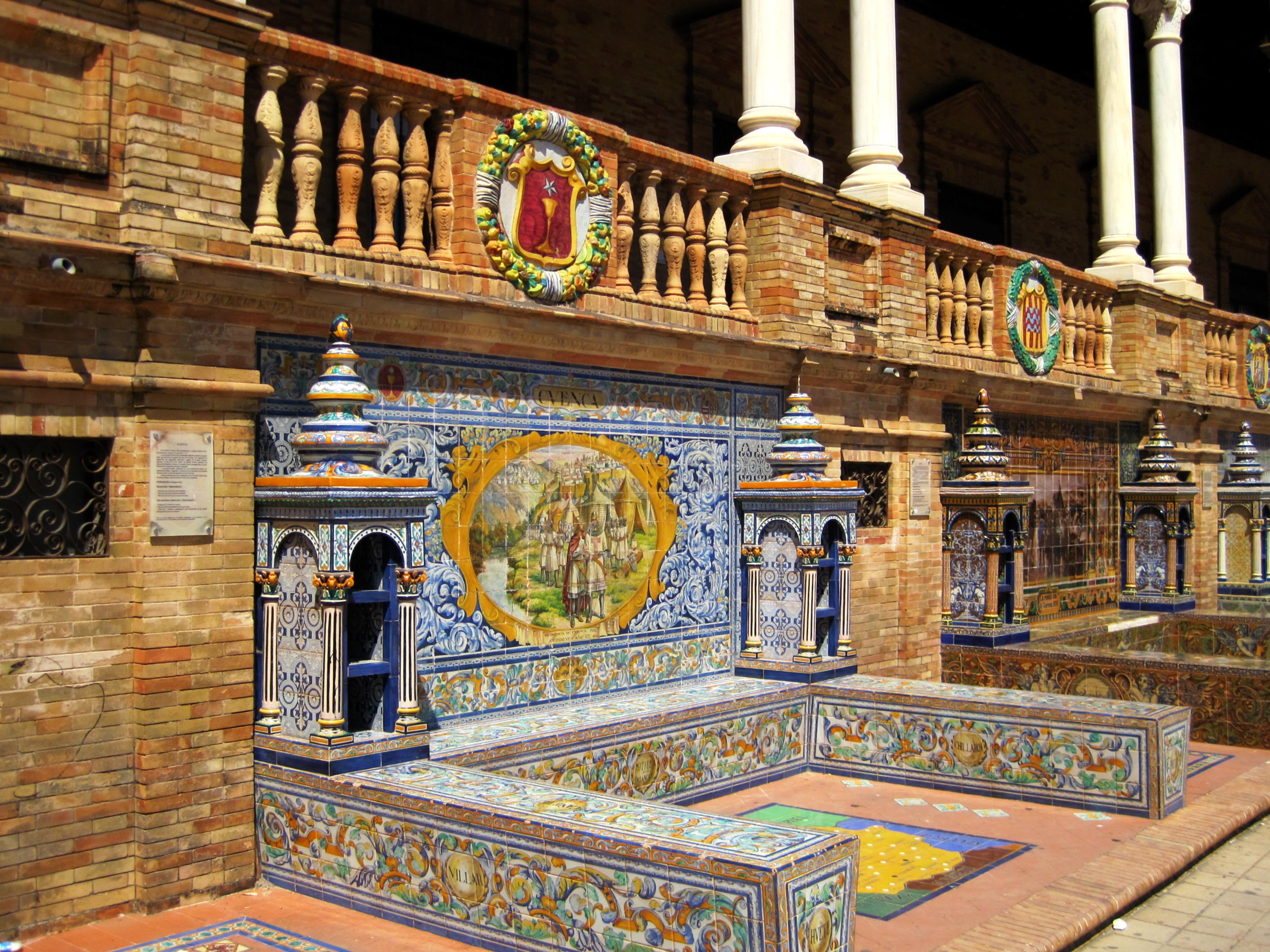
Ceramic provincial alcoves and benches at Plaza de España

Today, many of the pavilions from the exposition remain, notably the famous Plaza de España, which chronicles each of the regions of Spain in ceramic provincial alcoves and benches, as well as some of the national pavilions, which have now been converted to Consulate-Generals. Many of the buildings have been converted into museums and the pavilion of Argentina is now a flamenco school. They have also been featured in a number of films, including Lawrence of Arabia, The Wind and the Lion, and Star Wars: Episode II – Attack of the Clones, among others.

For Sevillans, the exposition marked the acceptance by the upper class of the traje de flamenca, an outfit worn by lower-class women.

The Exposition is reviewed by Evelyn Waugh in his collected travel writings, 'When The Going Was Good' 1946, Duckworth. See 'A Pleasure Cruise in 1929'.

== See also ==
- Barcelona Pavilion designed by Ludwig Mies van der Rohe, was the German Pavilion for the 1929 International Exposition in Barcelona, Spain.

== Bibliography ==
- Martin, Percy Alvin. (1931) "The Ibero-American Exposition at Seville." Vol. 11, No. 3. The Hispanic American Historical Review.
- "Seville Exposition." (20 May 2009) Time Magazine. Retrieved on 4 March 2009.
- "A Seminar in the History of Art at the University of Seville." (1930) Vol. 3. No. 1. Parnassuss.
- Williams, Mark. (1990) The Story of Spain. Malaga, Spain: Santana Books.
- Richman, Irving Berdine. (1919) The Spanish Conquerors: A Chronicle of the Dawn of Empire Overseas. New Haven, CT: Yale University Press.
