= Platero =

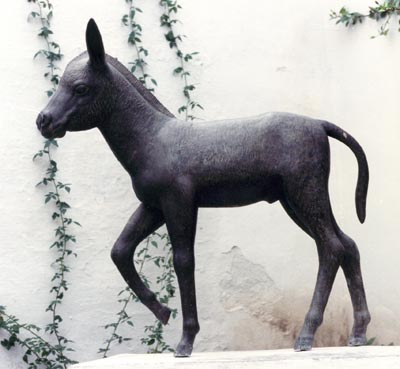
Bronze statue of Platero. Work from sculptor Leon Ortega; Moguer, Spain.

Platero is the eponymous donkey of the 1914 story Platero and I (English for Platero y yo). The book is one of the most popular works by Spanish poet Juan Ramón Jiménez, the recipient of the 1956 Nobel Prize in Literature.

Platero ("silvery") is described in the lyric prose of the book as a "small donkey, a soft, hairy donkey: so soft to the touch that he might be said to be made of cotton, with no bones. Only the jet mirrors of his eyes are hard like two black crystal scarabs."

The little donkey remains a symbol of tenderness, purity and naiveté, and is used by the author as a means of reflection about the simple joys of life, memories, and various characters and their ways of life.

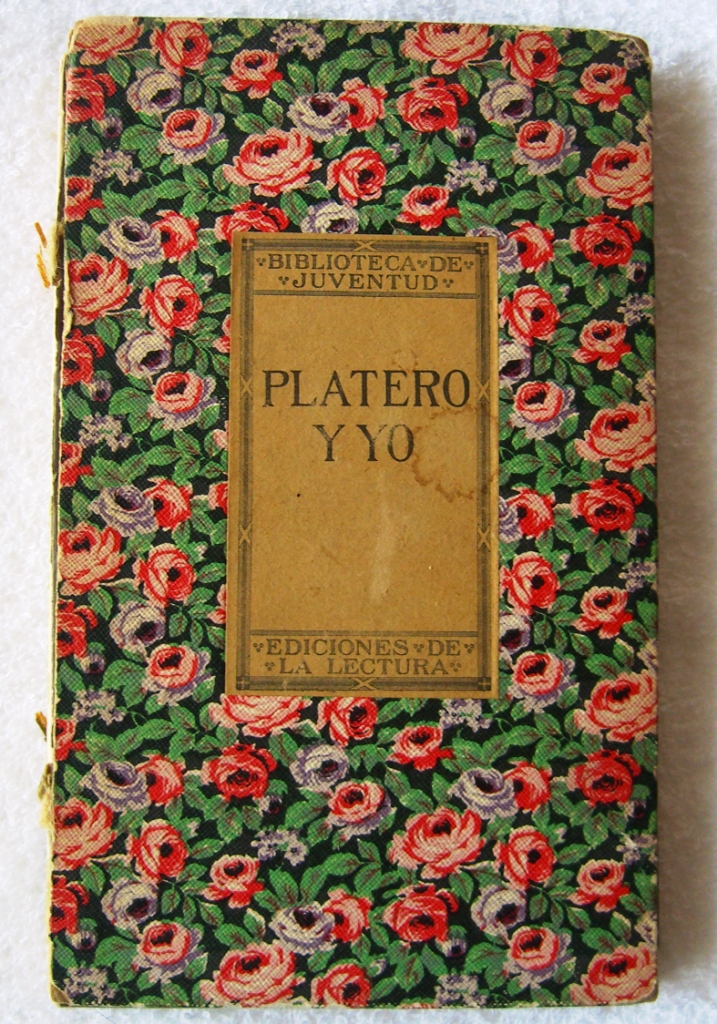
First edition of Platero y Yo (1914).

== Legacy ==
=== Burial ===
Platero was buried under a pine tree at a property used by Juan Ramón Jiménez between 1906 and 1910. In 2025 it was reported that the tree had been uprooted in a storm.

=== Musical adaptation ===
In 1960, the Italian composer Mario Castelnuovo-Tedesco composed a suite of music for guitar with narrator based on the book.

== See also ==
- Platero y Tú
