= Eduardo Sainz de la Maza =

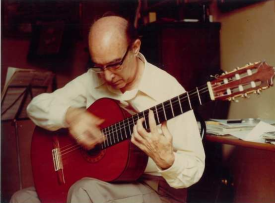
Eduardo Sainz de la Maza

Eduardo Sainz de la Maza (5 January 1903 – 5 December 1982) was a Spanish composer. Born in Burgos, he was brother of Regino Sainz de la Maza. Composing for the classical guitar, some of his notable works include the suite Platero y yo for guitar, and Campanas del alba. He died in Barcelona.

== Selected compositions ==
Guitar solo

- Homenaje a la guitarra (Paris: Éditions Françaises de Musique, 1962)
- Campanas del alba (Madrid: Unión Musical Española, 1963)
- Platero y yo (Madrid: Unión Musical Española, 1972)
- Laberinto. Critical edition by José Manuel González (Valencia: Piles, 2011)

== Bibliography ==
Thomas Schmitt: Eduardo Sáinz de la Maza: Guitarrista – profesor – compositor (Logroño: Ediciones El Gato Murr, 2012).
