= Platero and I =

Book of poems by Juan Ramón Jiménez

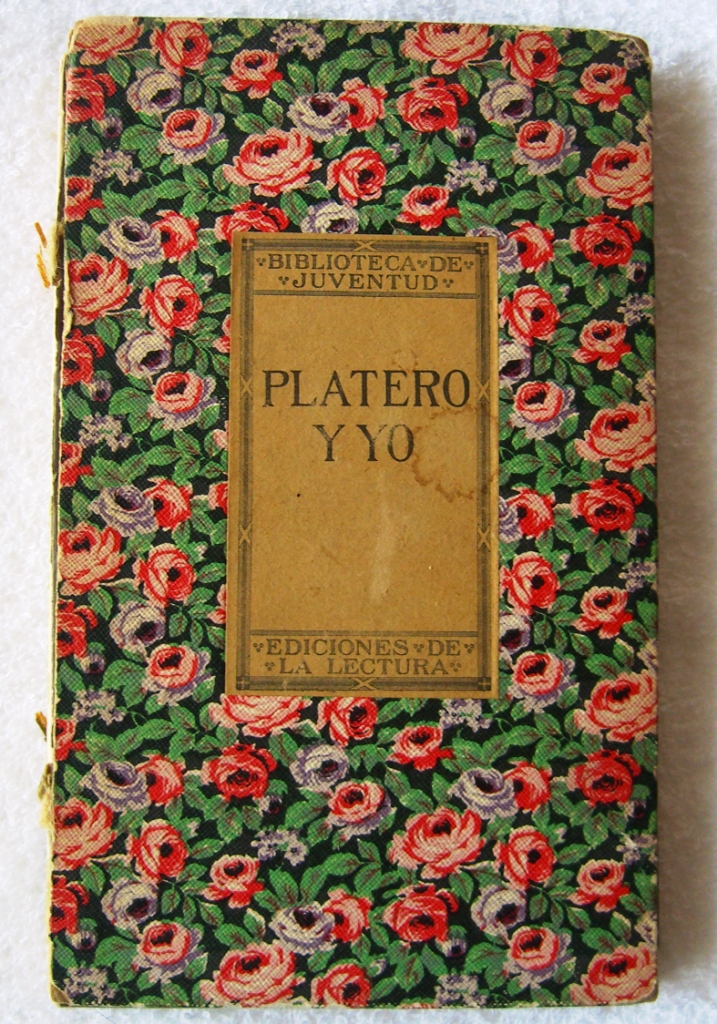
- First edition
- Author: Juan Ramón Jiménez
- Language: Spanish
- Genre: Lyric poetry
- Publisher: Ediciones de la Lectura
- Publication date: 1914
- Publication place: Spain
- Media type: Print
- Pages: 190

Platero and I, also translated as Platero and Me (Spanish: Platero y yo), is a 1914 Spanish prose poem by Juan Ramón Jiménez. The book is one of the most popular works by Jiménez, and unfolds around a writer and his eponymous donkey, Platero ("silvery"). Platero is a "small donkey, a soft, hairy donkey: so soft to the touch that he might be said to be made of cotton, with no bones. Only the jet mirrors of his eyes are hard like two black crystal scarabs." Platero remains a symbol of tenderness, purity and naiveté, and is used by the author as a means of reflection about the simple joys of life, memories, and various characters and their ways of life.

== Plot ==
Platero is a silver-colored donkey (plata means 'silver' in Spanish; platero means 'silvery') who throughout the years is seemingly the only constant friend and companion of the author, who makes observations to and confides in him. The author believes that Platero understands everything, except for the language of humans, just as humans do not know the language of animals, but he gives his master joy and sincere warmth.

== Adaptations ==
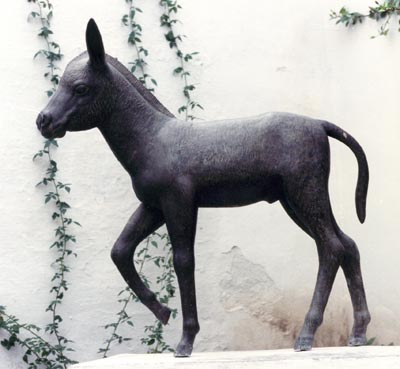
Bronze statue of Platero. Work from sculptor Ortega; Moguer, Spain.

In 1960, the Italian composer Mario Castelnuovo-Tedesco composed a suite of music for guitar with narrator based on the stories in the book. In 1968, the Spanish film director Alfredo Castellón adapted the book into a movie by the same title. The guitarist and composer Eduardo Sainz de la Maza also wrote a suite of eight pieces for guitar based on Platero Y Yo, which bears the same title.

A theatrical adaptation has been written by Josep-Antoni Garí, published in the literary magazine Ex Tempore and presented at the literary evening of the Circle of Writers of the United Nations, in Geneva, on 20 January 2017, thus commemorating the centenary of the work.
