= Juan Ramón Jiménez =

Spanish poet (1881–1958)

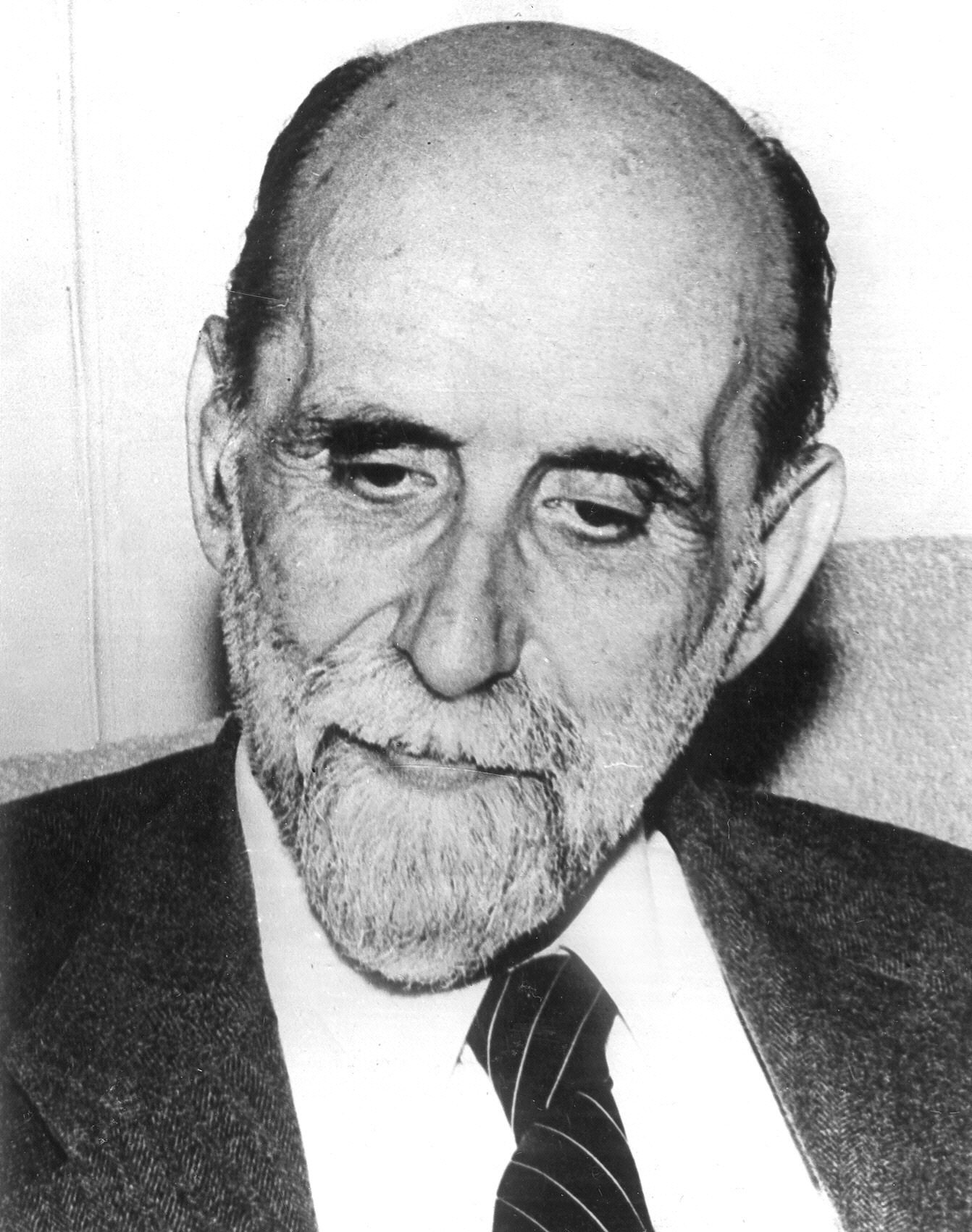
- Born: Juan Ramón Jiménez Mantecón; 23 December 1881; Moguer, Huelva, Andalucia, Spain
- Died: 29 May 1958 (aged 76); San Juan, Puerto Rico
- Occupation: poet
- Spouse: Zenobia Camprubí
- Writing career
- Genre: poetry
- Notable awards: Nobel Prize in Literature 1956

Signature
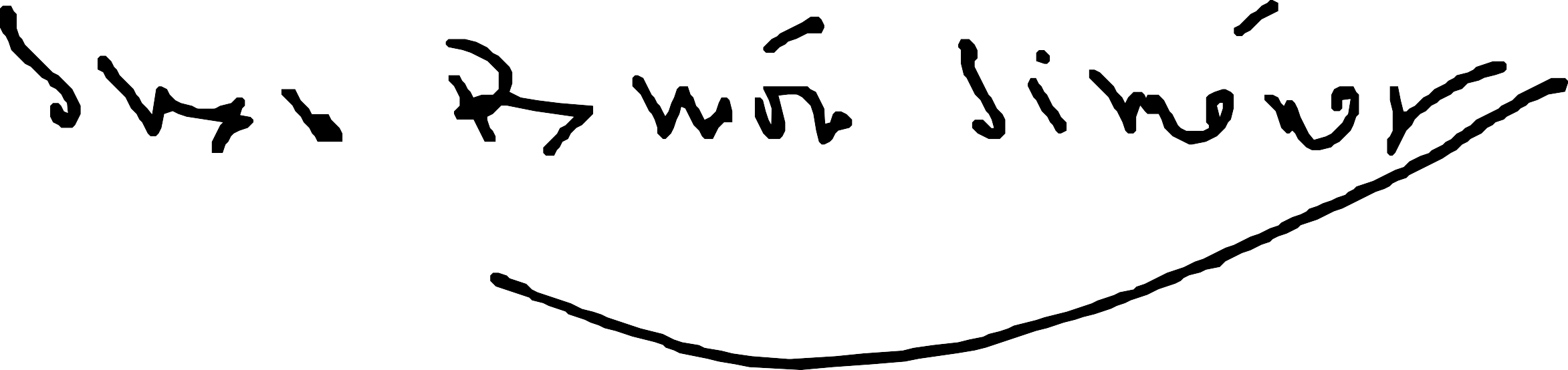

Juan Ramón Jiménez Mantecón (Spanish: [xwan raˈmoŋ xiˈmeneθ manteˈkon]; (Note: In isolation, Ramón is pronounced [raˈmon].) 23 December 1881 – 29 May 1958) was a Spanish poet, a prolific writer who received the 1956 Nobel Prize in Literature "for his lyrical poetry, which in the Spanish language constitutes an example of high spirit and artistic purity". One of Jiménez's most important contributions to modern poetry was his advocacy of the concept of "pure poetry".

== Biography ==
=== Early life ===
Juan Ramón Jiménez was born in Moguer, near Huelva, in Andalucia, on 23 December 1881. He was educated in the Jesuit institution of San Luis Gonzaga, in El Puerto de Santa María, near Cádiz. Later, he studied law and painting at the University of Seville, but he soon discovered that his talents were better used for writing. He then dedicated himself to literature, under the influence of Rubén Darío and French symbolism. He published his first two books at the age of eighteen, in 1900. The death of his father the same year devastated him, and a resulting depression led to his being sent first to France, where he had an affair with his doctor's wife, and then to a sanatorium in Madrid staffed by novice nuns, where he lived from 1901 to 1903.

In about 1904 Jiménez was hoodwinked by some Peruvians. José Gálvez, Carlos Rodríguez Hübner and a 15 year old Maria Isabel Sanchez-Concha created a fictional woman named Georgina Hübner and they started a correspondence with the poet. José and Carlos were hoping to get access to his writing and Sanchez-Concha did the writing. Jiménez fell in love with their creation and planned to travel to Peru to meet the young woman. The plan was only aborted by a telegram they arranged via the Spanish consul to the poet, giving him the fabricated news of Georgina's death.

=== Career ===
He was among the contributors of the Madrid-based avant-garde magazine Prometeo between 1908 and 1912. In 1911 and 1912, he wrote many erotic poems depicting romps with numerous women in numerous locales. Some of them alluded to sex with novices who were nurses. Eventually, apparently, their mother superior discovered the activity and expelled him, although it is not known whether the sexual activity described in his poems actually occurred.

The main subjects of many of his other poems were music and color, which, at times, he compared to love or lust.

He suffered a mental breakdown and depression, so he stayed hospitalised in France and Madrid. He celebrated his home region in his prose poem about a writer and his donkey called Platero and I (1914). In 1916 he and Spanish-born writer and poet Zenobia Camprubí were married in the United States. Zenobia became his indispensable companion and collaborator.

Upon the outbreak of the Spanish Civil War, he and Zenobia went into exile in Puerto Rico, where he settled in 1946. Jiménez was hospitalized for eight months due to another deep depression. He later became a Professor of Spanish Language and Literature at the University of Puerto Rico. His literary influence on Puerto Rican writers strongly marks the works of Giannina Braschi, René Marqués, Aurora de Albornoz, and Manuel Ramos Otero. The university named a building on campus and a writing program in his honor. He was also a professor at the University of Miami in Coral Gables, Florida. While living in Coral Gables he wrote "Romances de Coral Gables". In addition, he was a professor in the Department of Spanish and Portuguese at the University of Maryland, which renamed Jimenez Hall for him in 1981.

Although he was primarily a poet, Jiménez' prose work Platero y yo (1917; "Platero and I"; Platero is a donkey) sold well in Latin America and in translation won him popularity in the USA. He also collaborated with his wife in the translation of the Irish playwright John Millington Synge's Riders to the Sea (1920). His poetic output during his life was immense.

Among his better known works are:

- Sonetos Espirituales 1914–1916 (1916; "Spiritual Sonnets, 1914–15")
- Piedra y Cielo (1919; "Stones and Sky")
- Poesía en Verso, 1917–1923 (1923; "Poetry in Verse")
- Poesía en Prosa y verso (1932; "Poetry in Prose and Verse")
- Voces de mi Copla (1945; "Voices of My Song"), and
- Animal de Fondo (1947; "Animal at Bottom").

Both Jiménez and Camprubí used a simplified Spanish orthography different from the RAE standard. A collection of 300 poems (1903–53) in English translation by Eloise Roach was published in 1962.

=== Later life and death ===
In 1956, he received the Nobel Prize in Literature; two days later, his wife died of uterus cancer. Jiménez never recovered from the emotional devastation, and he died two years afterwards, on 29 May 1958, in the same clinic where his wife had died. Both are buried in his hometown of Moguer, Spain.

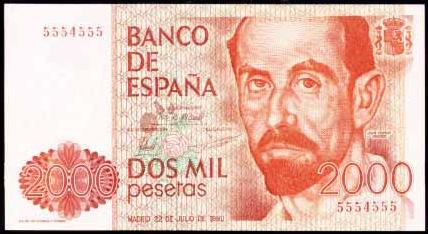
Juan Ramón Jiménez depicted on the 1980 2,000 Pesetas banknote

== In popular culture ==
- A quotation from Jiménez, "If they give you ruled paper, write the other way," is the epigraph to Ray Bradbury's novel Fahrenheit 451 (1953).
- The same quotation used in Fahrenheit 451 is used in The Lovely Bones (2002) by Alice Sebold.
- The Spanish film director Alfredo Castellón adapted Jiménez's novel Platero and I into a movie by the same title, produced in 1965 and released in 1967.
- The Spanglish novel Yo-Yo Boing! (1998) by the Puerto Rican author Giannina Braschi features a scene in which poets and artists debate Jiménez's genius versus that of other Spanish-language poets Francisco de Quevedo, Luis de Góngora, Rubén Darío, Pablo Neruda, Federico García Lorca, and Julia de Burgos.
- A rock band in Spain is named Platero y Tú after Jiménez's novel.

== Streets named after Jiménez ==
Several streets have been named after Jiménez, including one in Madrid, one in Valencia, and one in Quintanar de la Orden, Toledo.

== Published works (original editions) ==
- Ninfeas (Water Lilies), 1900-Madrid.
- Almas de violeta (Souls of Violet), 1900-Madrid.
- Rimas (Rhymes), 1902-Madrid.
- Arias tristes (Sad Arias), 1902
- Jardines lejanos (Distant Gardens), 1904
- Elejías puras (Pure Elegies), 1908
- Elejías intermedias (Intermediate Elegies), 1909
- Las hojas verdes (The Green Leaves), 1909
- Poemas mágicos y dolientes (Magic and Painful Poems), 1909
- Elejías lamentables (Sad Elegies), 1910
- Baladas de primavera (Ballads of Spring), 1910
- La soledad sonora (The Sonorous Loneliness), 1911
- Pastorales (Pastoral), 1911
- Melancolía (the sonorous loneliness), 1912
- Laberinto (Labyrinth), 1913
- Platero y yo (Platero and I) (edición reducida), 1914
- Estío (Summer), 1916
- Sonetos espirituales (Spiritual Sonnets), 1917
- Diario de un poeta recién casado (Diary of a Recently Married Poet), 1917
- Platero y yo (edición completa) (Platero and I), 1917
- Eternidades (Eternities), 1918
- Piedra y cielo (Stone and Sky), 1919
- Segunda antología poética (Second Poetic Anthology), 1922
- Poesía (Poetry), 1923
- Belleza (Beauty), 1923
- Canción (Song), 1935
- Voces de mi copla (Voices of my Verse), 1945
- La estación total (The Full Season), 1946
- Romances de Coral Gables (Romances from Coral Gables), 1948
- Animal de fondo (Animal from the Deep), 1949
- Una colina meridiana (A Shining Hill), 1950 (1° edición en España: Huerga & Fierro editores, 2002). Prólogo y estudio preliminar de Alfonso Alegre Heitzmann.
- La frente pensativa (1911-1912) [cuatro poemas inéditos] (The Thoughtful Face), introducción de José Luis Puerto, Zamora: Lucerna, 2001.
- I Am Not I

== Published works (translations) ==
- Books of Love: The Lost Poems of Juan Ramon Jimenez. Athens:Kinchafoonee Creek Press, 2022.

== See also ==
- Spanish poetry
- Modernismo
- Puerto Rican literature
- Sonnet

== Bibliography ==
- de Albornoz, Aurora, ed. 1980. Juan Ramón Jiménez. Madrid: Taurus.
- Blasco, F. J. 1982. La Poética de Juan Ramón Jiménez. Desarrollo, contexto y sistema. Salamanca.
- Campoamor González, Antonio. 1976. Vida y poesía de Juan Ramón Jiménez. Madrid: Sedmay.
- Campoamor González, Antonio. 1982. Bibliografía general de Juan Ramón Jiménez. Madrid: Taurus.
- El Cultural. 14 Jun 2007. Los poemas eróticos de Juan Ramon Jiménez. Aparece Libros de amor. Conoce los poemas del JRJ más lujurioso
- Diario de Córdoba. 6 Jan 2007. ´Libros de amor´ descubre a un Juan Ramón Jiménez erótico
- Díez-Canedo, E. 1944. Juan Ramón Jiménez en su obra. México City.
- Guardian (London). 19 Jun 2007. My sex in the convent - by Nobel poet
- Font, María T. 1973. Espacio: autobiografía lírica de Juan Ramón Jiménez. Madrid.
- Guerrero Ruiz, J . 1961. Juan Ramón de viva voz. Madrid.
- Gullón, R. 1958. Conversaciones con Juan Ramón Jiménez. Madrid.
- Jensen, Julio, 2012, The Poetry of Juan Ramón Jiménez. An Example of Modern Subjectivity. Copenhagen.
- Juliá, M. 1989. El universo de Juan Ramón Jiménez. Madrid.
- Olson, P.R. 1967. Circle of Paradox: time and essence in the poetry of Juan Ramon Jimenez. Baltimore.
- Palau de Nemes, G. 1974. Vida y obra de Juan Ramón Jiménez. 2/e. 2 v. Madrid: Gredos.
- Predmore, Michael P. 1966. La obra en prosa de Juan Ramón Jiménez. Madrid: Gredos.
- Salgado, M. A. 1968. El arte polifacético de las caricaturas líricas juanramonianas. Madrid.
