= Sights and landmarks of Seville =

There are numerous sights and landmarks of Seville, Spain. The most important sights are the Alcázar, the Seville Cathedral, and the Archivo General de Indias (General Archive of the Indies), which are UNESCO World Heritage Sites.

== Landmarks ==
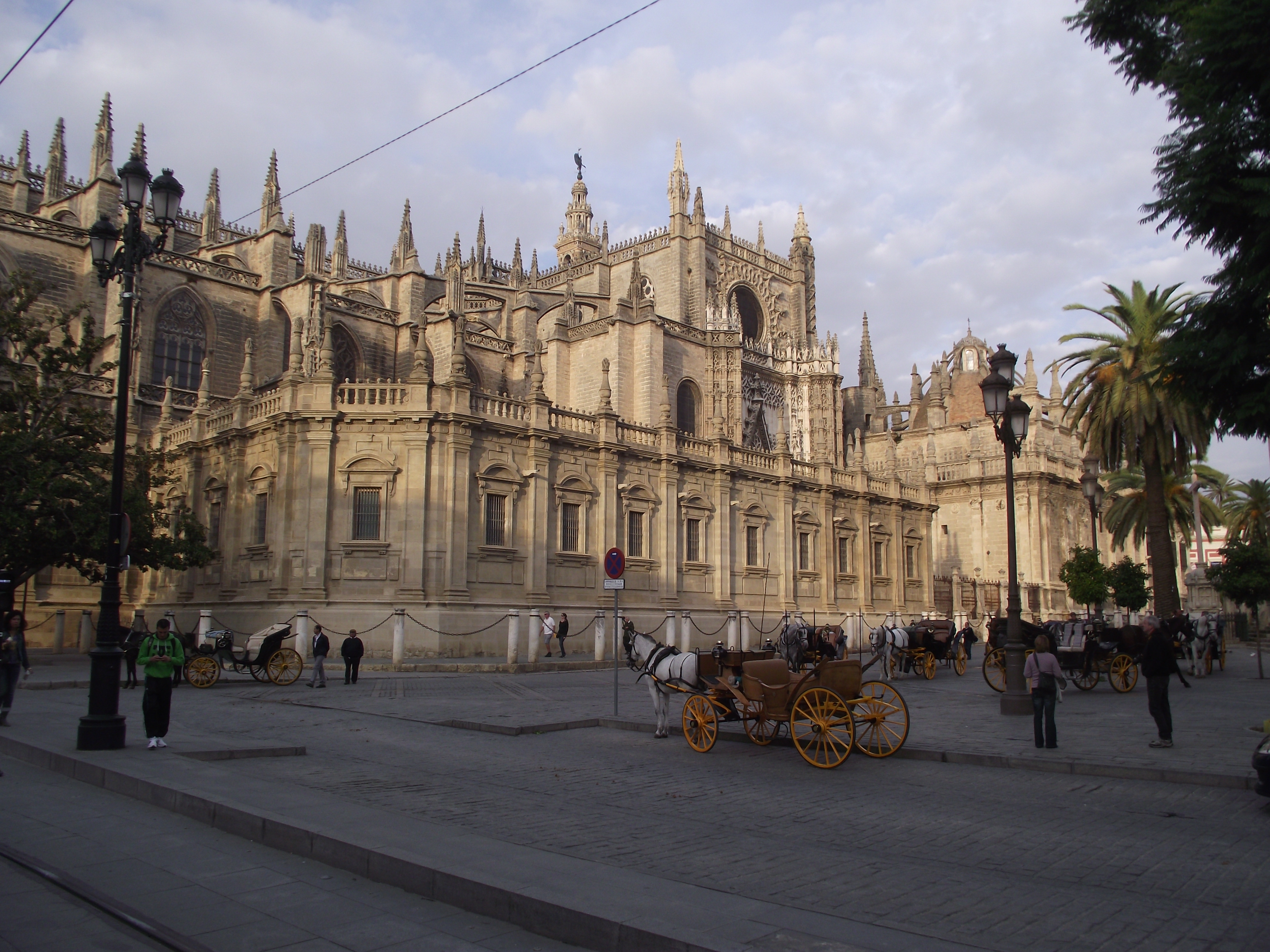
South façade of the Cathedral of St. Mary of Seville.

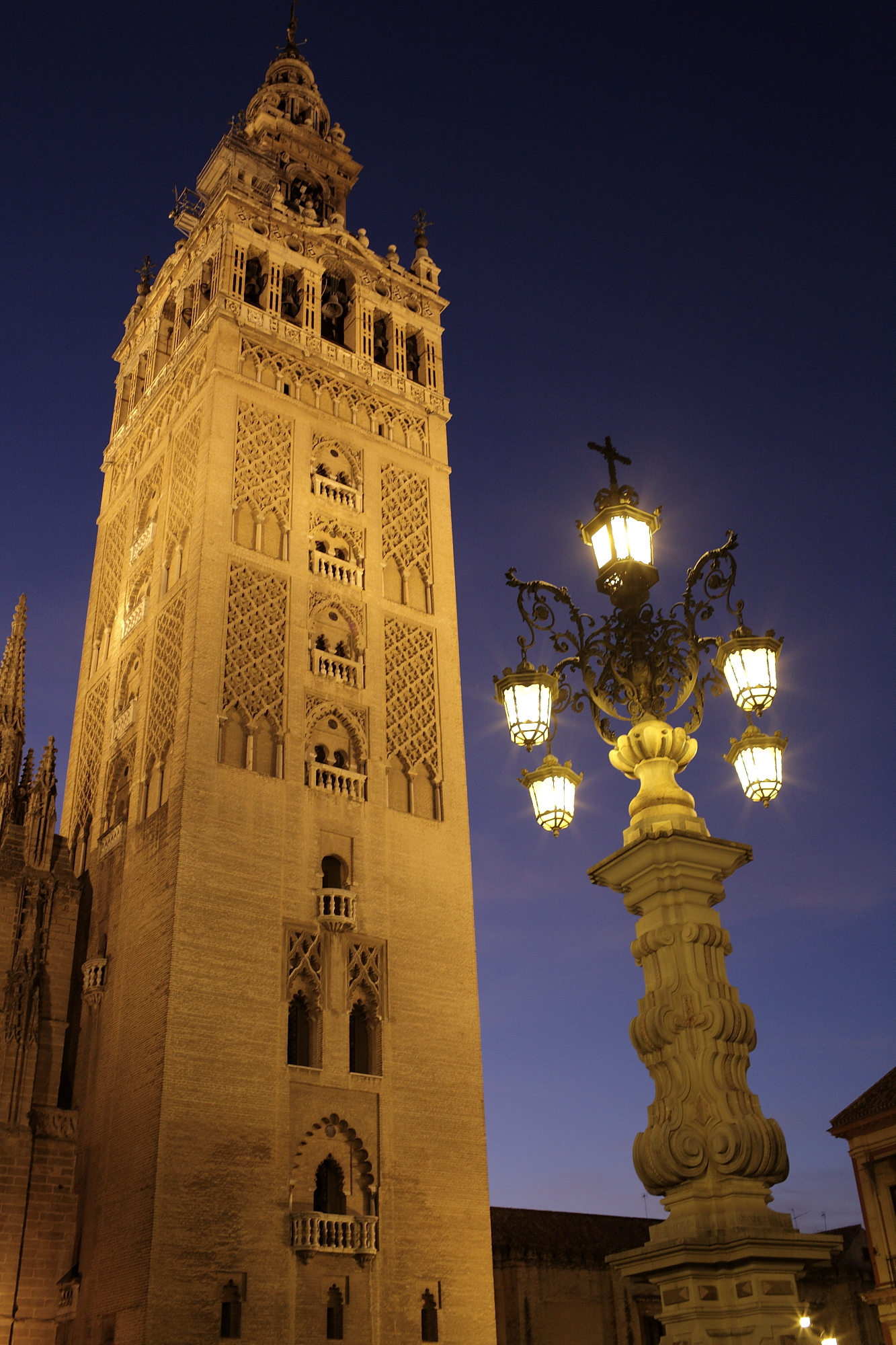
The Giralda

The Cathedral of St. Mary was built from 1401 to 1519 after the Reconquista on the former site of the city's mosque. It is among the largest of all medieval and Gothic cathedrals, in terms of both area and volume. The interior is the longest nave in Spain, and is lavishly decorated, with a large quantity of gold evident. The Cathedral reused some columns and elements from the mosque, and, most famously, the Giralda, originally a minaret, was converted into a bell tower. It is topped with a statue, known locally as El Giraldillo, representing Faith. The tower's interior was built with ramps rather than stairs, to allow the Muezzin and others to ride on horseback to the top.

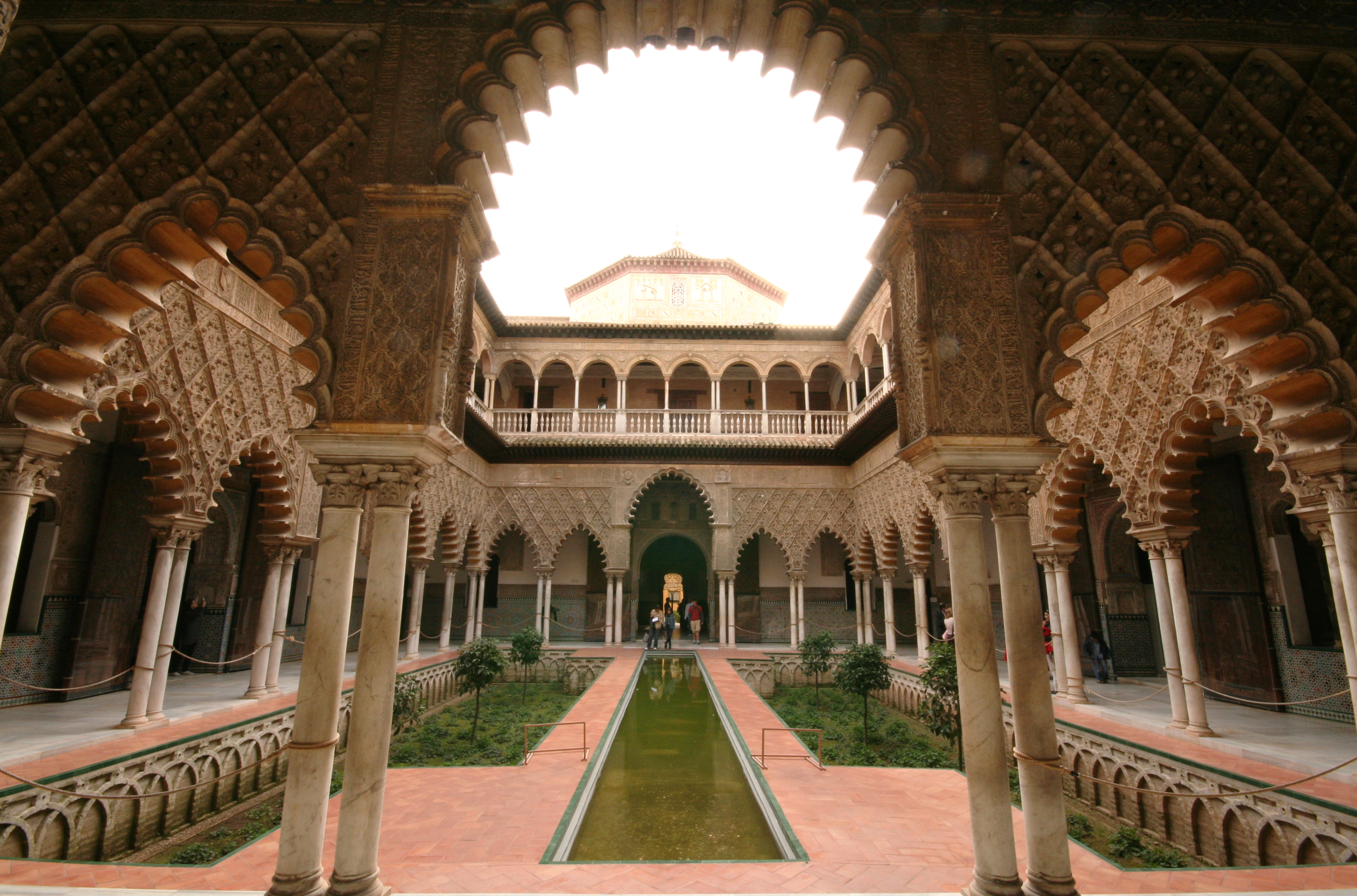
Courtyard of the Maidens in the Alcázar of Seville

The Alcázar facing the cathedral was developed from a previous Moorish Palace. Construction was started in 1181 and continued for over 500 years, mainly in the Mudéjar style, but also in the Renaissance style. Its gardens are a blend of Moorish, Renaissance, and English traditions.

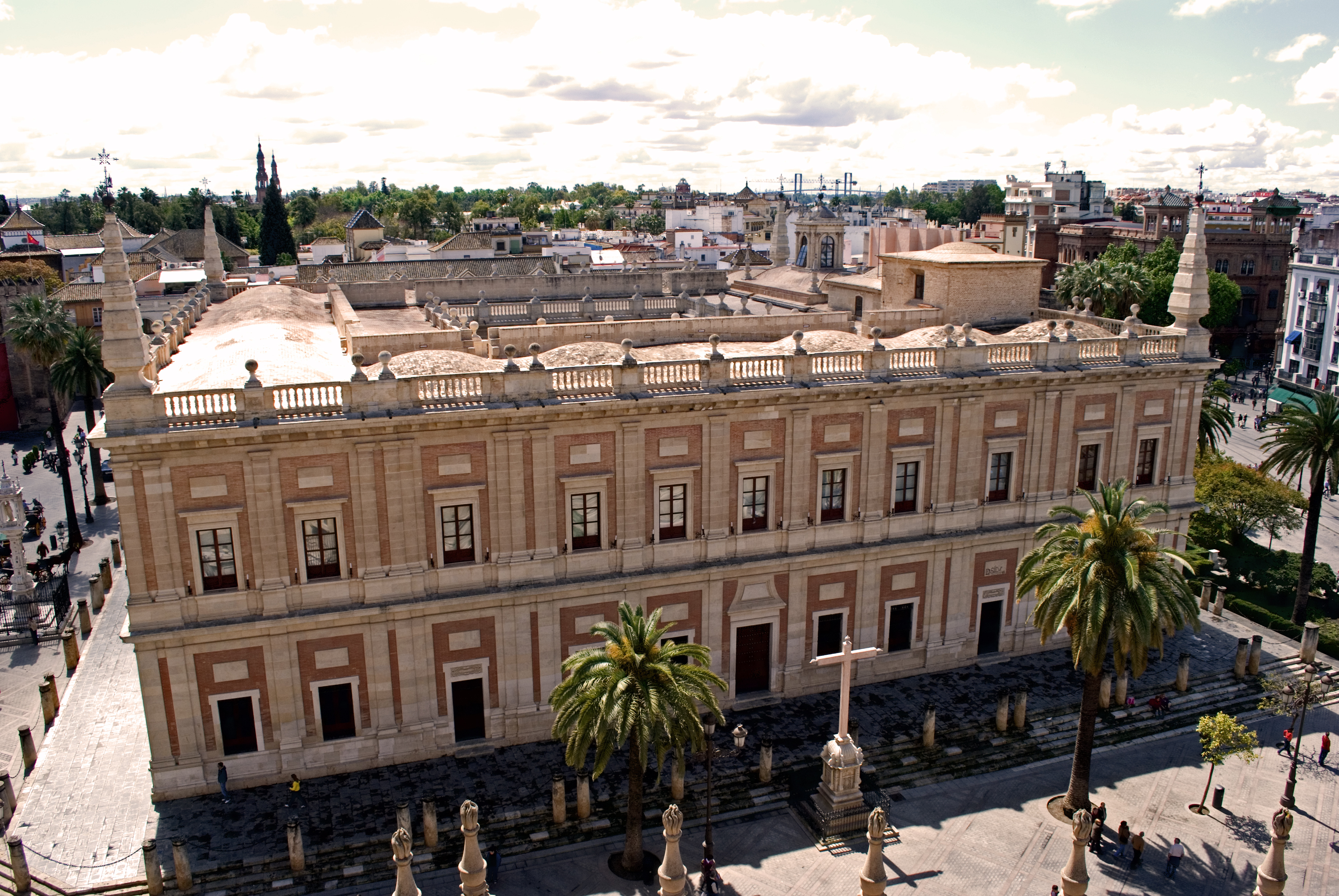
General Archive of the Indies

The General Archive of the Indies, is the repository of extremely valuable archival documents illustrating the history of the Spanish Empire in the Americas and the Philippines. The building itself, an unusually serene and Italianate example of Spanish Renaissance architecture, was designed by Juan de Herrera.

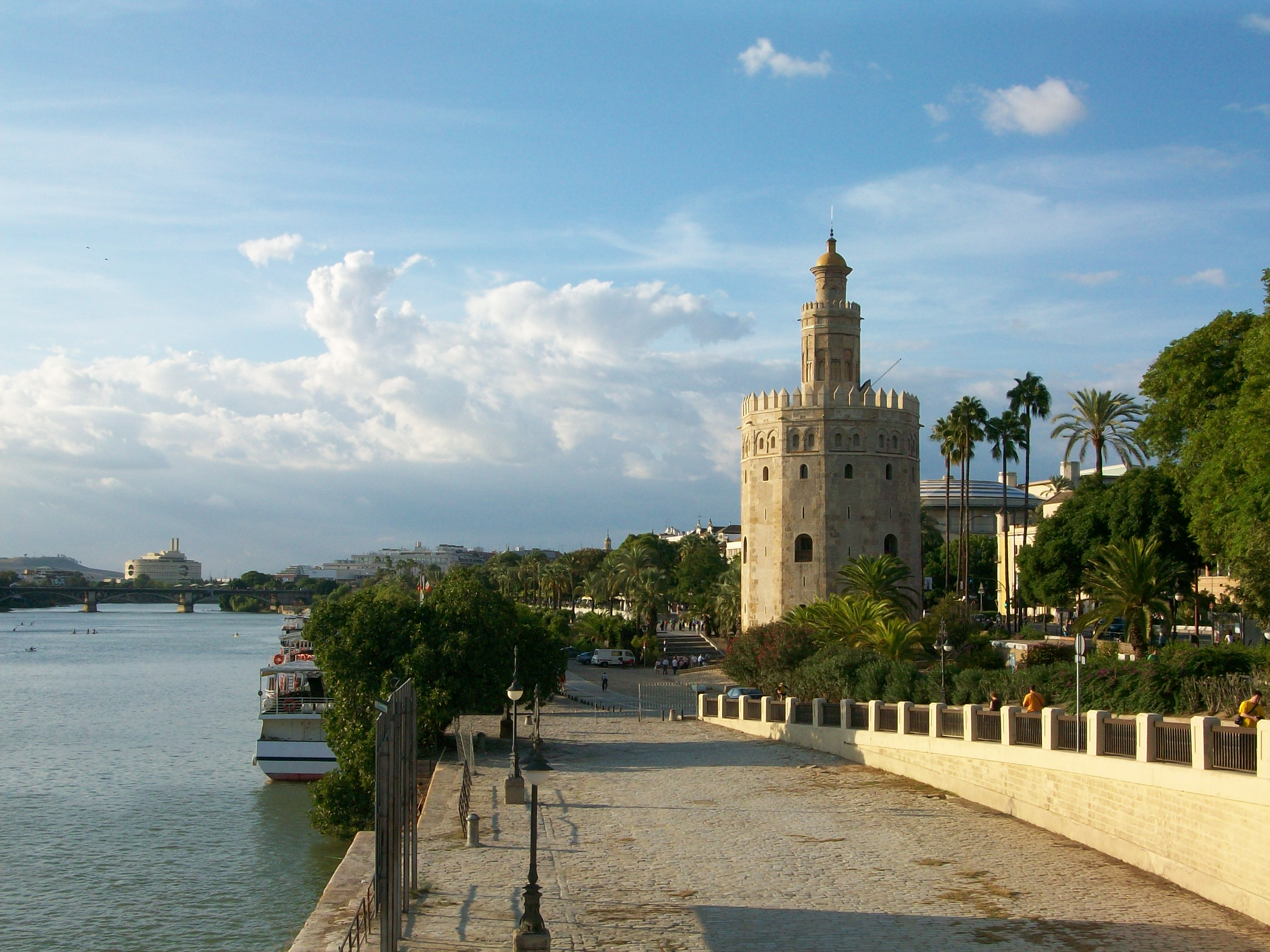
Torre del Oro (The Gold Tower) and the Guadalquivir River.

The Torre del Oro was built by the Almohad dynasty as a watchtower and defensive barrier on the river. A chain was strung through the water from the base of the tower to prevent boats from travelling into the river port. Since 1944, it has housed a naval museum.

The City Hall was built in the 16th century in high Plateresque style by master architect Diego de Riaño. The façade to Plaza Nueva was built in the 19th century in Neoclassical style.

The Palace of San Telmo, formerly the University of Sailors, and later the Seminary, is now the seat for the Andalusian Autonomous Government. It is one of the most emblematic buildings of baroque architecture, mainly to its world-renowned churrigueresque principal façade and the impressive chapel.

The Royal Tobacco Factory is housed on the original site of the first tobacco factory in Europe, a vast 18th-century building in Baroque style and the purported inspiration for the opera Carmen.

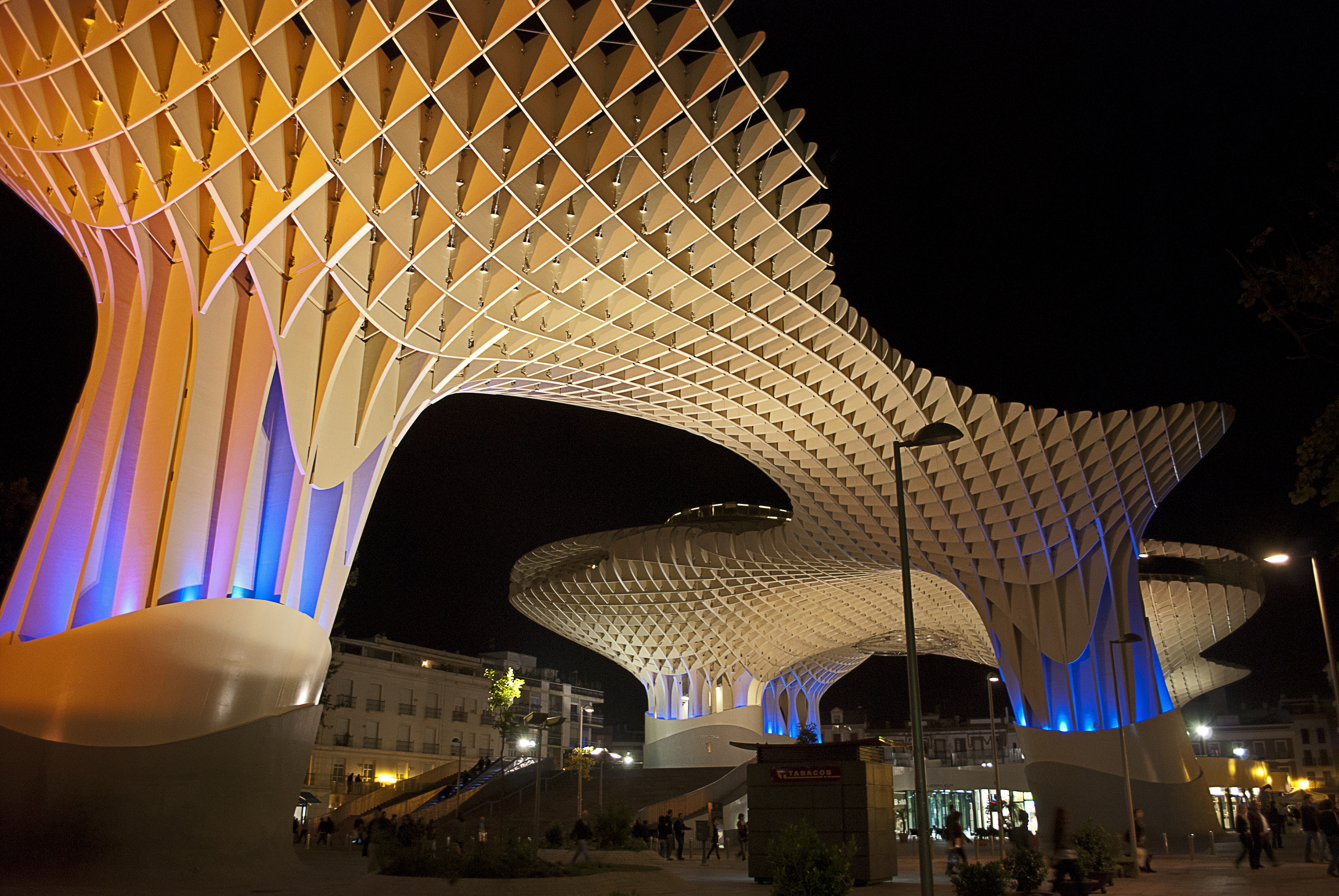
Metropol Parasol (popularly known as The Mushrooms).

The Metropol Parasol, in La Encarnación square, is the world's largest wooden structure. A monumental umbrella-like building designed by the German architect Jürgen Mayer, finished in 2011. This modern architecture structure houses the central market and an underground archaeological complex. The terrace roof is a city viewpoint.

The Plaza de España, in Maria Luisa Park (Parque de Maria Luisa), was built by the architect Aníbal González for the 1929 Exposición Ibero-Americana. It is an outstanding example of Regionalist Revival Architecture, a bizarre and loftily conceived mixture of diverse historic styles, such as Art Deco and Neo-Mudéjar and lavishly ornamented with typical glazed tiles.

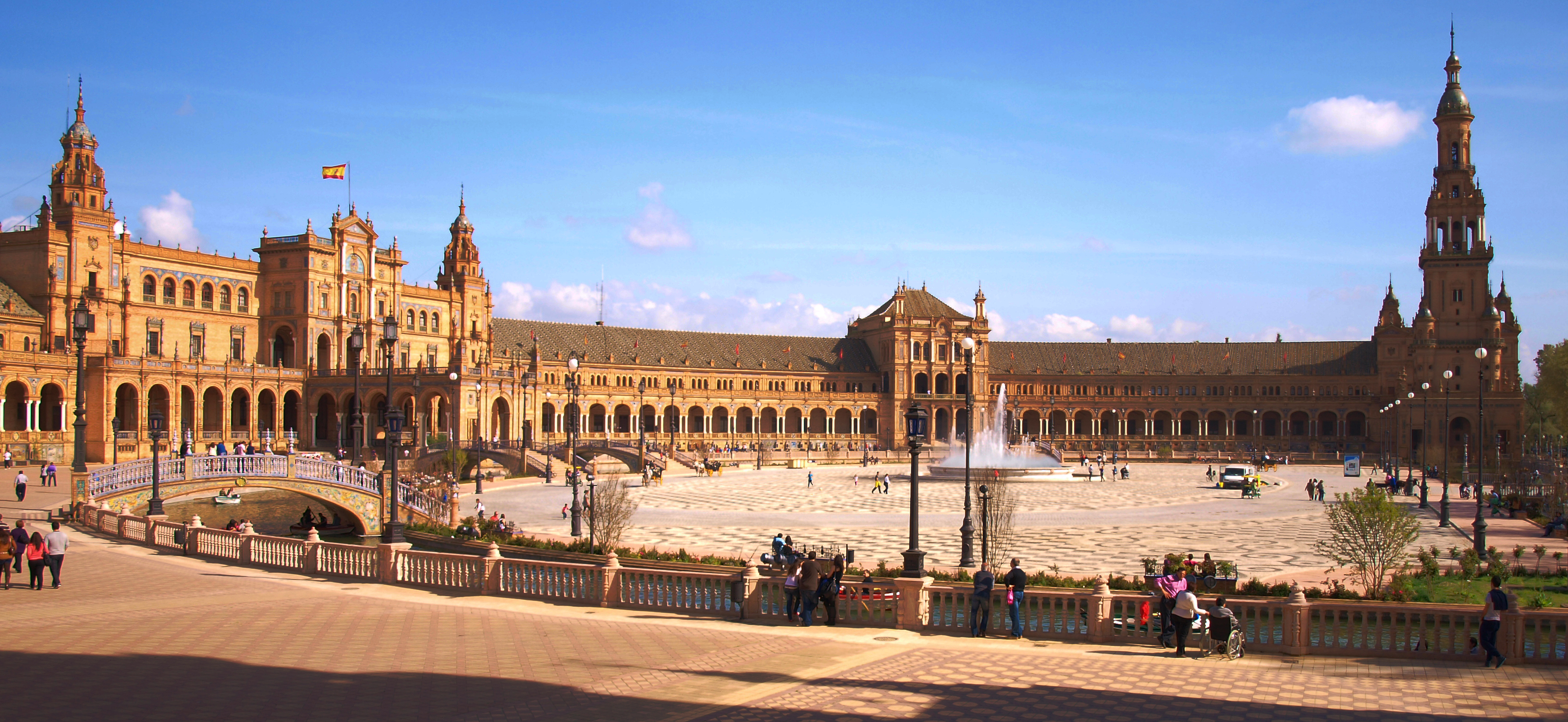
Plaza de España, panoramic view.

The neighbourhood of Triana, situated on the west bank of the Guadalquivir River, played an important role in the history of the city and constitutes by itself a folk, monumental and cultural center.

On the other hand, La Macarena neighbourhood is located on the northern side of the city centre. It contains some important monuments and religious buildings, such as the Museum and Basilica of La Macarena or the Hospital de las Cinco Llagas.

== Museums ==
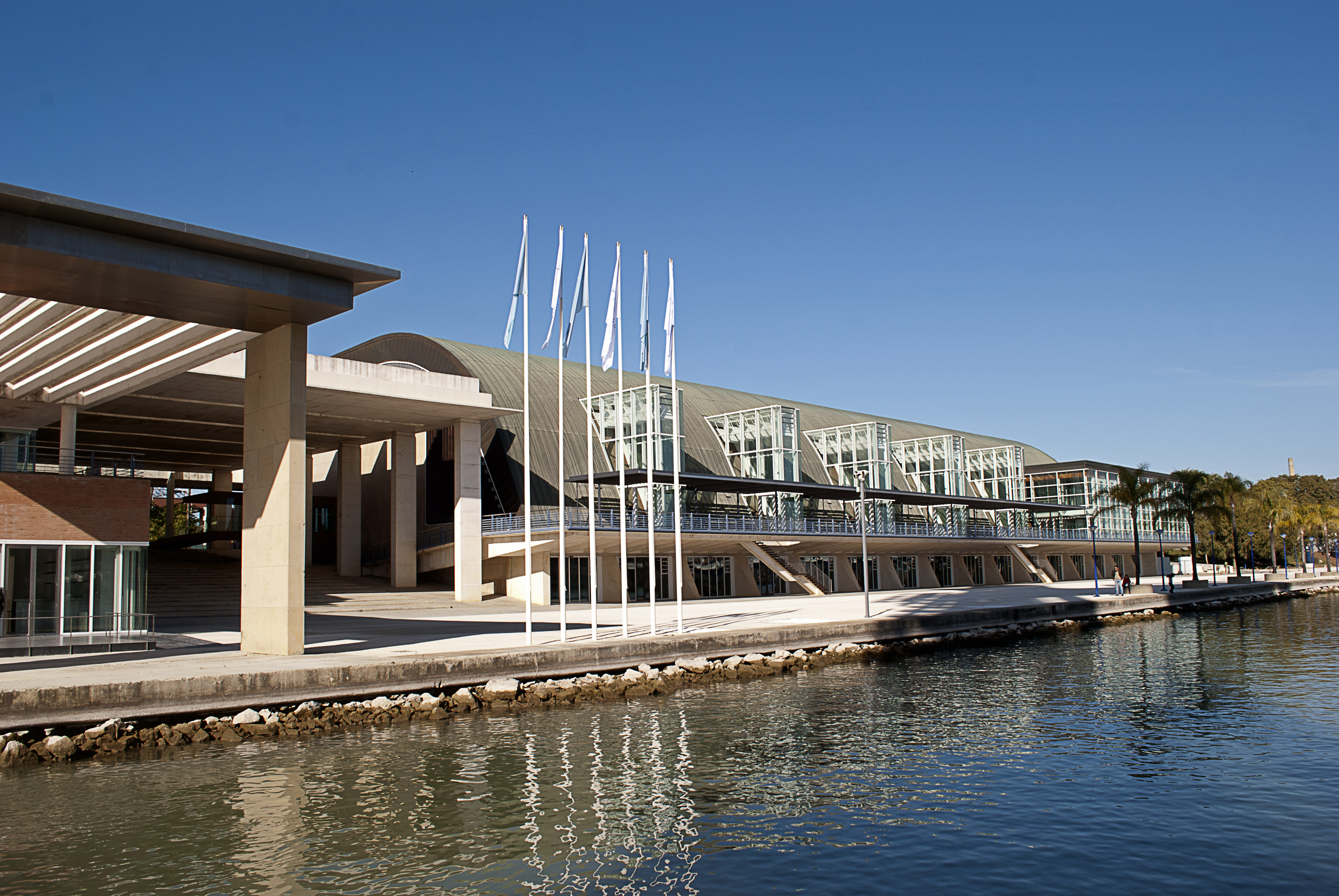
Navigation Pavilion, of the Expo 92, today the Navigation Museum.

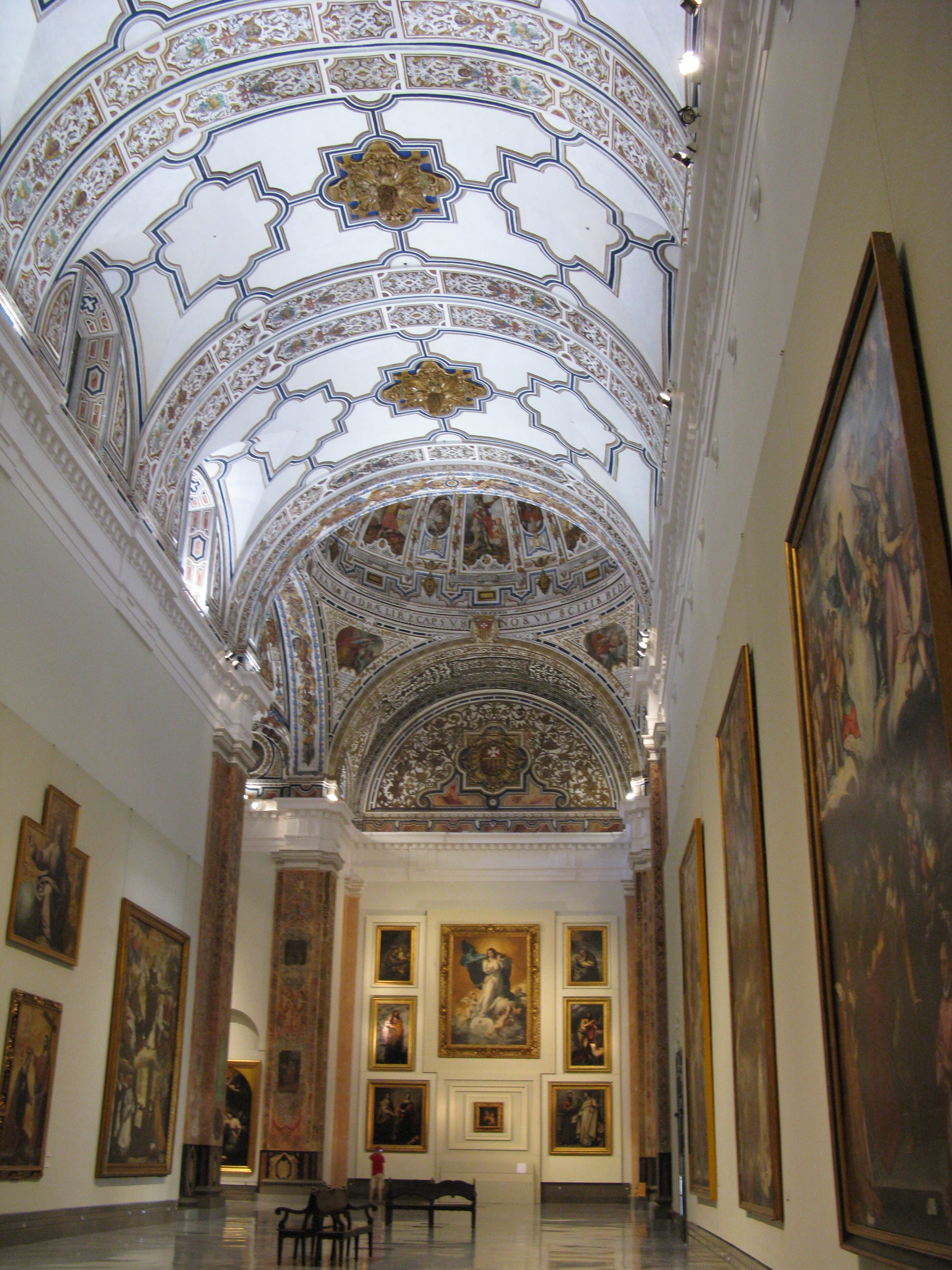
Museum of Fine Arts of Seville

The most important art collection of Seville is the Museum of Fine Arts of Seville. It was established in 1835 in the former Convent of La Merced. It holds many masterworks by Murillo, Pacheco, Zurbarán, Valdés Leal, and others masters of the Baroque Sevillian School, containing also Flemish paintings of the 15th and 16th centuries. Entry to most of the museums in Seville is free on Mondays.

Other museums in Seville are:

- The Archaeological Museum, which contains collections from the Tartessian and Roman periods, placed in América square at María Luisa Park.
- The Museum of Arts and Traditions, also in América square, in front of the Archaeological museum.
- The Andalusian Contemporary Art Centre, placed in La Cartuja.
- The Naval Museum, housed in the Torre del Oro, next to the Guadalquivir river.
- The Carriages Museum, in the historic Convento de los Remedios.
- The Flamenco Art Museum
- The Bullfight Museum, in La Maestranza bullring
- The Palace of the Countess of Lebrija, a private collection that contains many of the mosaic floors discovered in the nearby Roman town of Italica.
- The "Centro Velázquez" (Velázquez Centre) located at the Old Priests Hospital in the turistic Santa Cruz neighbourhood.
- The Antiquarium at Metropol Parasol, an underground museum that exhibits in situ Roman and Muslim remains.
- The Castillo de San Jorge (Castle of St. George) remains, below the Triana market, next to Isabel II bridge. It was the last seat for the Spanish Inquisition.
- The Museum and Treasure of La Macarena, where the collection of the Macarena brotherhood is exhibited. This exhibition gives visitors an accurate impression about the Seville Holy Week.

== Parks and gardens ==
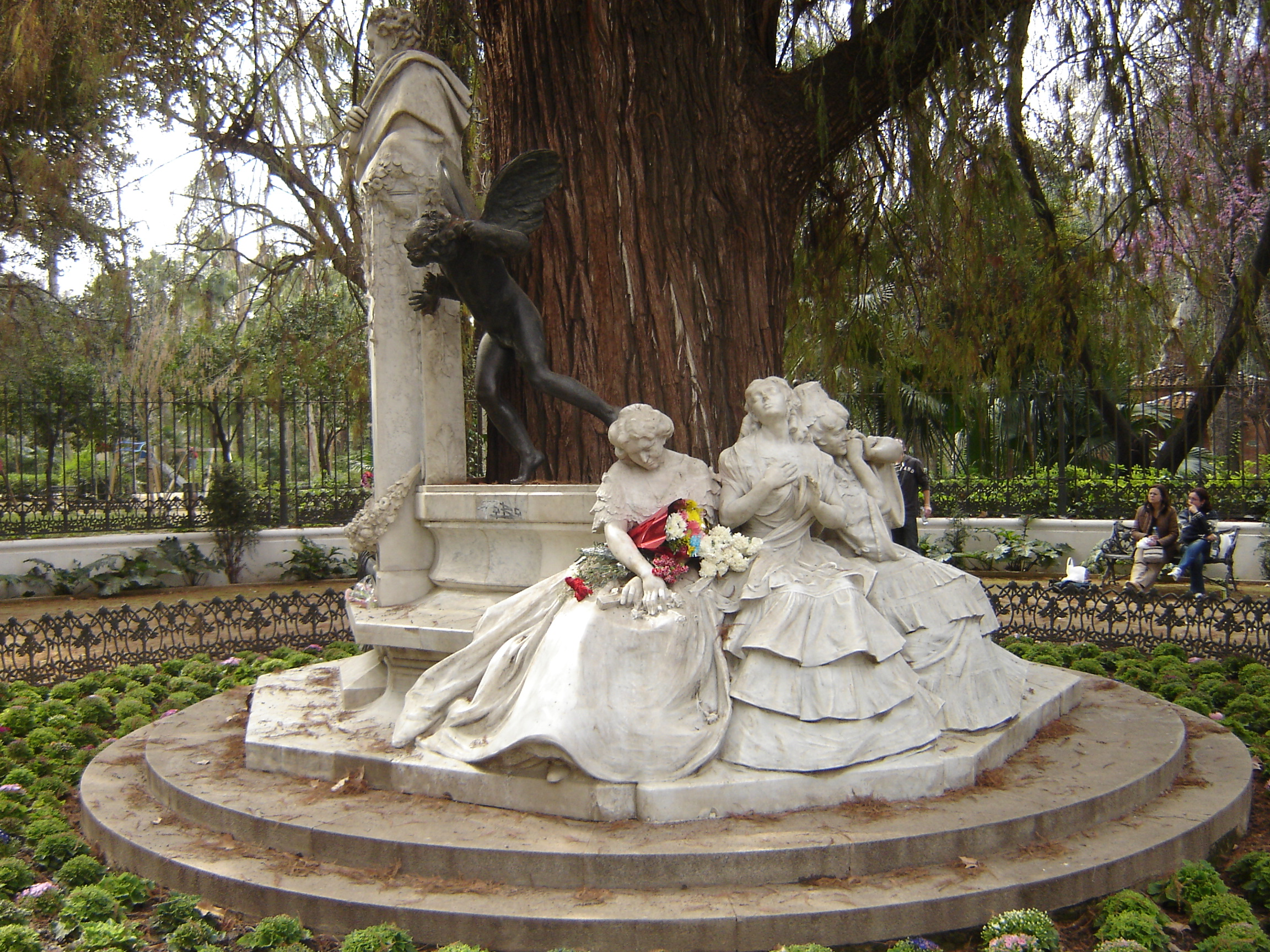
Monument dedicated to Gustavo Adolfo Bécquer in María Luisa Park

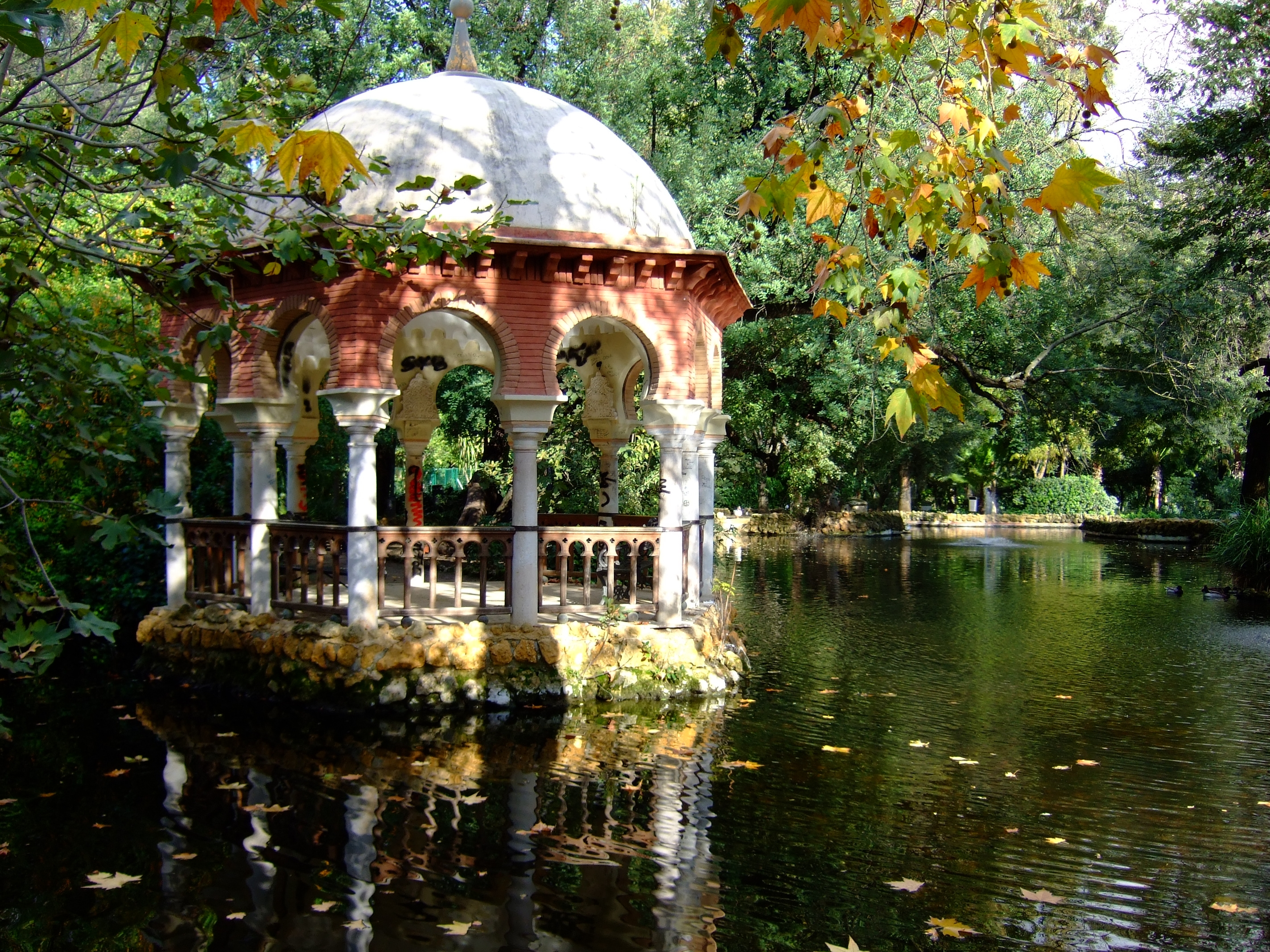
Pergola in María Luisa Park

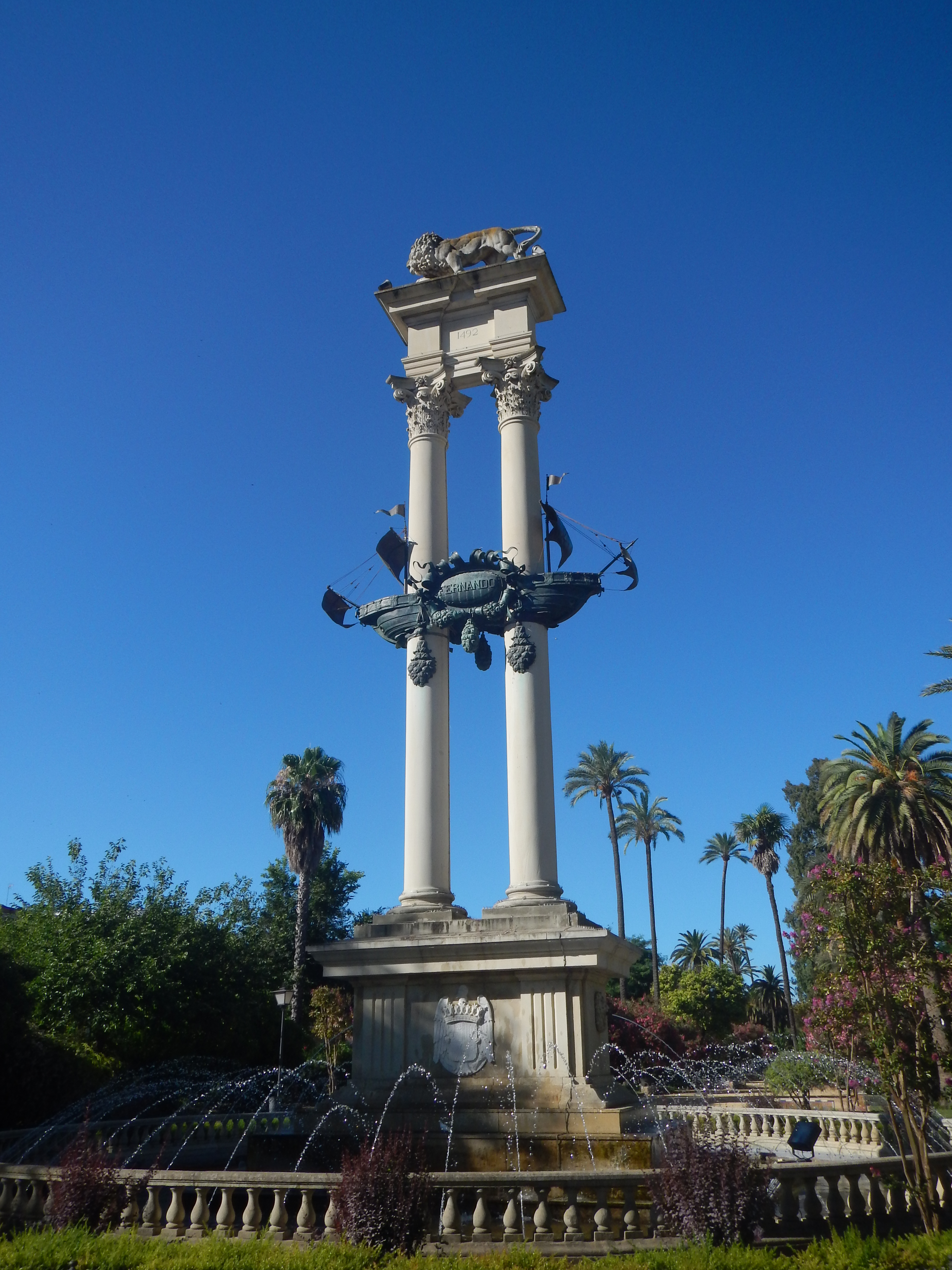
Columbus monument (2014) in The Gardens of Murillo

- The Parque de María Luisa (María Luisa Park), is a monumental park built for the 1929 World's Fair held in Seville, the Exposición Ibero-Americana. The so-called Jardines de las Delicias (literally, Delighting Gardens), closer to the river, are part of the Parque de María Luisa.
- The Alcázar Gardens, within the grounds of the Alcázar palace, consist of several sectors developed in different historical styles. A Renaissance terrace garden fronts the space leading from the Gothic part of the palace, whereas the outermost part is an English style garden. The areas closest to the Mudéjar buildings were kept in Moorish style.
- The Gardens of Murillo and the Gardens of Catalina de Ribera, both along and outside the South wall of the Alcázar, lie next to the Santa Cruz quarter. They were developed from parts of the Alcazar gardens after being transferred to the City. The appearance of the gardens is due to aesthetic improvements made at the beginning of the 20th century, following classic gardening styles with a predominant Moorish Revival influence. There is a monument to Columbus, which consists of the caravel Santa Maria between two towering white columns with a lion on top.
- The Parque del Alamillo y San Jerónimo, the largest park in Andalusia, was originally built for Seville Expo '92 to reproduce the Andalusian native flora. It lines both Guadalquivir shores around the San Jerónimo meander. The impressive 32-meters-high bronze sculpture, "Birth of the New World" (popularly known as Columbus's Egg, el Huevo de Colón), by the Georgian sculptor Zurab Tsereteli, is located in its northwestern sector.

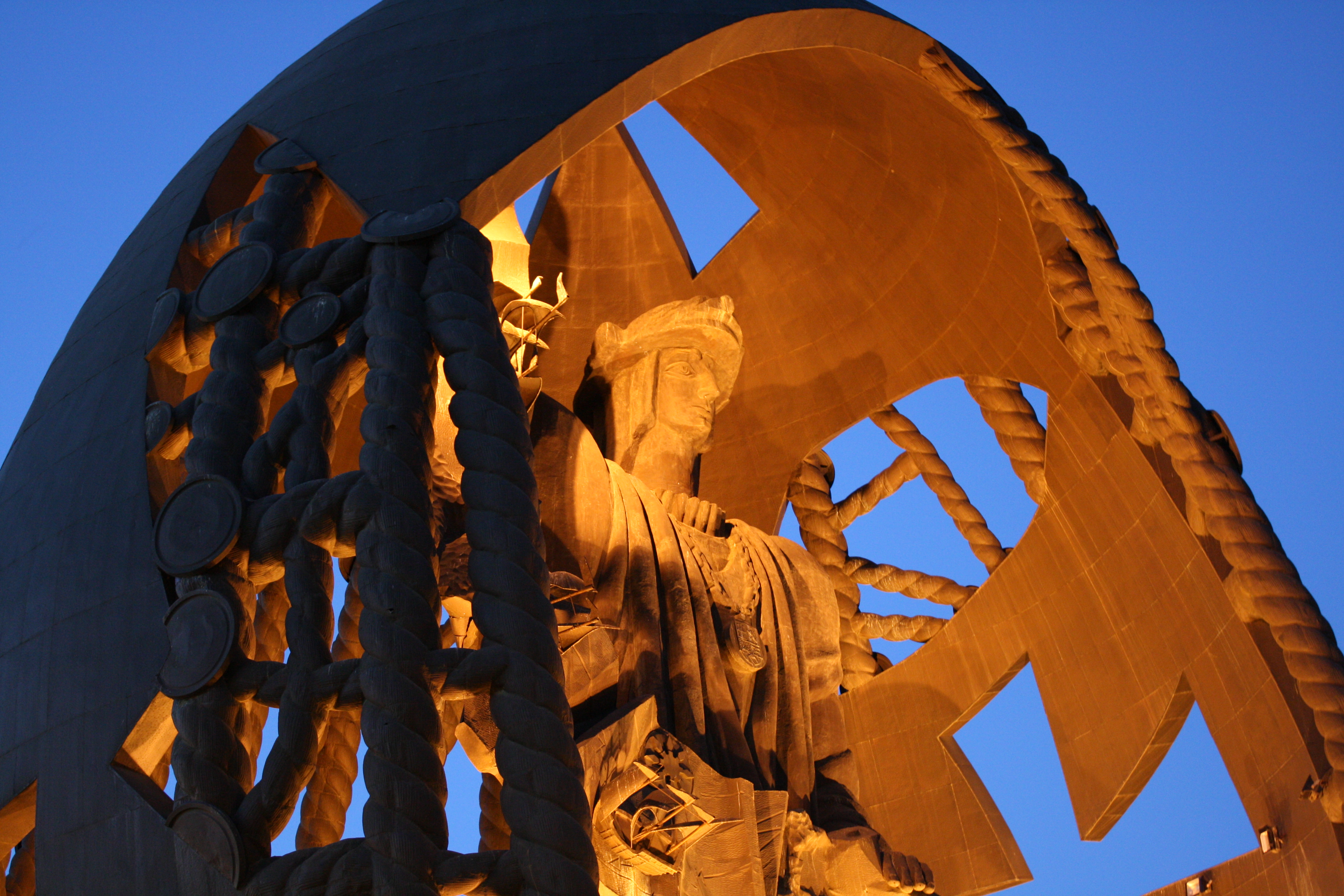
Birth of the New World in the Alamillo and San Jerónimo Park

- The American Garden, also completed for Expo '92, is in La Cartuja. It is a public botanical garden, with a representative collection of American plants donated by different countries on the occasion of the world exposition. Despite its extraordinary botanical value, today it is a mostly abandoned place and lacks basic maintenance.

Although it is not properly a park, most of the Guadalquivir's banks constitute a linear string of parks and green areas from "Delicias" bridge to the Parque del Alamillo. The Chapina green, between the Plaza de Armas bus station and the Isabel II bridge, offers a panoramic view of the Triana old quarter neighbourhood, and is a popular zone for relaxing and sunbathing. La Cartuja's rivershore has a well-developed shady river forest, panoramic piers, and floating walkways.

Other prominent parks and gardens include:

- Jardines de Cristina, Romantic gardens built at 1830 in Puerta Jerez, close to the Cathedral and Alcázar, are named after King Ferdinand VII's second wife María Cristina. After the 2011 restoration, they were dedicated to the Generation of '27 poets.
- Parque de los Príncipes, the second oldest park in the city, built in 1973 in the Los Remedios neighbourhood.
- Parque de Miraflores, the second largest park of Seville, on the NE side of the city. It houses an area of traditional vegetable gardens, and several ancient farm buildings dating from Roman and Moorish times.
- Jardines de la Buhaira, in Nervión neighbourhood. It was modified at the end of the 20th century, inspired by traditional farm-gardening. The irrigation channels and the reservoir are original Moorish remains.
- Jardines del Valle, on the northeast side of the city center. Developed from the vegetable gardens of an old monastery. Here is found a well-preserved stretch of the Almohad City Wall.
- Jardines del Guadalquivir, in La Cartuja, a modern-art garden built for Expo '92 within the exhibition site as a resting area.
- Parque Amate is a park in the East of the city which opened in 1987. It has an area of 3444451.333 ft². It has a sport centre with swimming pool and a small bullring.
- Parque del Tamarguillo is a periurban park on the North-East of the City. It was created in 2010 and it's close to the stream Tamarguillo.
- Isla Mágica, on La Cartuja is an amusement and thematic park, with dozens of attractions just to the west of Seville. It was built on the site of Expo'92.
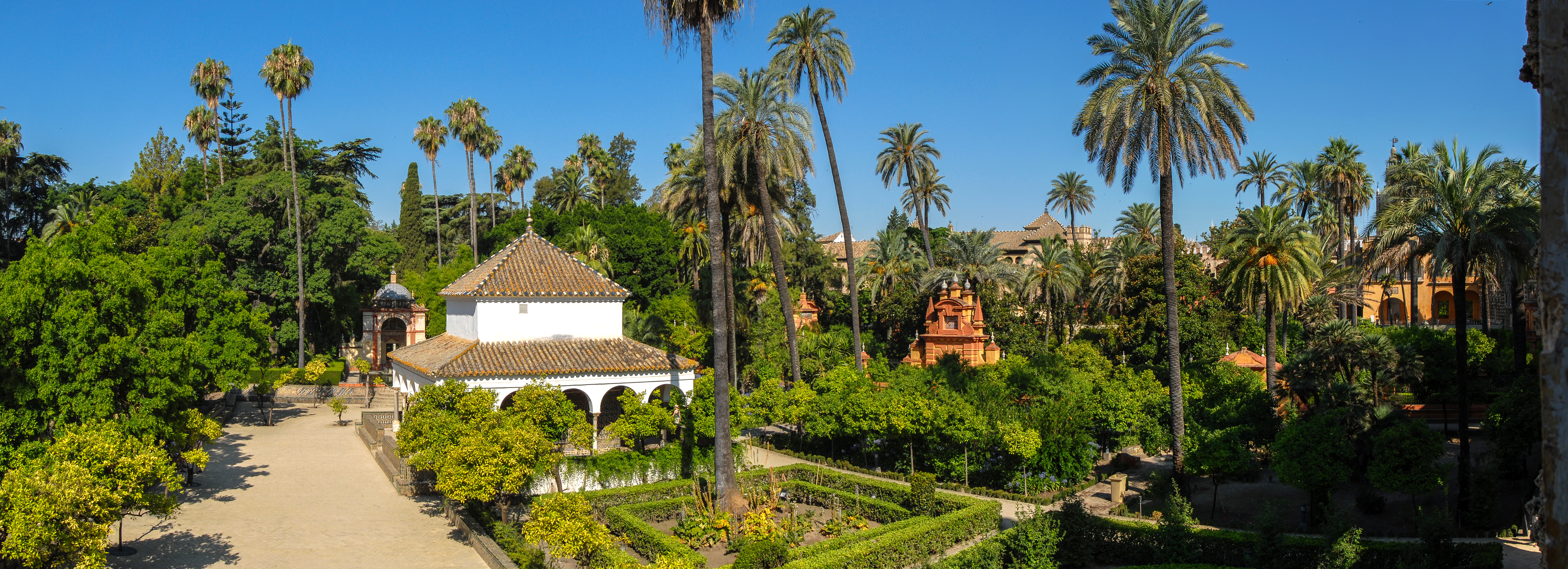
The Alcázar Gardens

== See also ==
- Azulejo
- Walls of Seville
- Demolished landmarks in Seville
