= Costurero de la Reina =

Building in Seville Province, Spain

Coordinates: 37.37604°N 5.991518°W

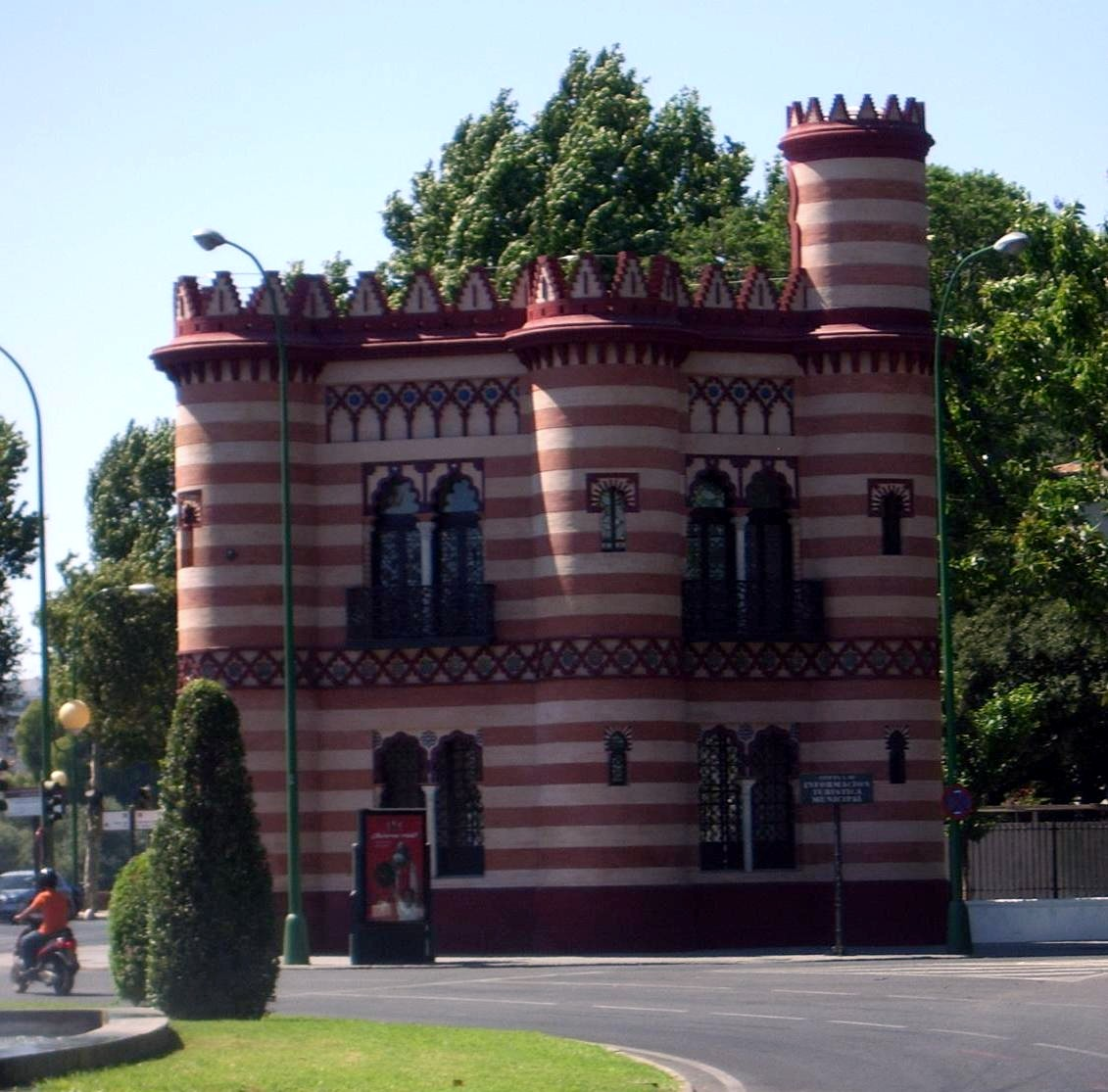
The Queen's sewing box

The Costurero de la Reina (literally, the Queen's sewing box) is a building constructed in the late nineteenth century in the gardens of the Palace of San Telmo, now the Maria Luisa Park in Seville, Spain. This unique building takes the form of a small hexagonal castle with turrets at the corners.

The building was the guard house or garden retreat. It is the oldest building in Seville in the neomudéjar style. The name comes from a popular tradition that Mercedes of Orléans, the future wife of King Alfonso XII of Spain, retired to the pavilion where she passed her time sewing. The reality is more prosaic. The formal name is the "Pavilion of San Telmo". Mercedes died of typhus about fifteen years before the building was erected in 1893.

Nowadays the Costurero de la Reina lodges the tourist information office on the ground floor. The opening times are 9-2 pm and 3.30 to 7.30 pm, on weekdays and 10-2 pm during weekends and bank holidays. The building was restored in the spring of 2007 to repair the main structure and to arrange the interior in order to make it more functional. The first floor was refurbished recently and it is used as meetings and events room of the local government.

== History ==
In the 19th century Antoine of Orléans, Duke of Montpensier, he settled to live in the Palacio de San Telmo of Seville (today the seat of the Government of the Junta of Andalusia). The enormous gardens of the Palace would be adapted according to the romantic tastes. In 1893 is built in the area of the gardens near the Guadalquivir river a small tower for the guard, being the architect Juan Talavera and de la Vega (father of the regional architect Juan Talavera y Heredia). It is the first Neo-Mudéjar building in Seville, being able to appreciate the Arabic style in the large windows. In 1890 the Duke of Montpensier dies and in 1893 his wife, Luisa Fernanda of Bourbon, cedes the gardens of the Palace to the city of Seville. After this, there is a small extension to the north that will continue to be the private garden of the Palacio de San Telmo, most of the gardens would become the María Luisa Park and the castle and a small extension of the surrounding garden would be enclosed. The area is populated with other neomudéjars buildings, such as the Plaza de España, on the occasion of the Ibero-American Exposition of 1929 .

== Costurero de la Reina as Seville Tourist Office ==
It is currently used as the Tourist Information Office of the Seville City Council. Seville Tourism Office Hours: 9 a.m. to 7.30 p.m. Weekends and holidays attend visitors to the city from 10 a.m. to 2 p.m. More information on the page of [Turismo de Sevilla, visitasevilla.es]

In addition to its functions as Municipal Tourist Information Office on the ground floor, the first floor has been set up as tourism administrative units.

The Costurero de la Reina inspired the portal of the Seville Fair of the year 2008.

== Sevillian Legend ==
It is a historical fact that in 1878 the daughter of the Duke of Montpensier, Maria de las Mercedes of Orléans, married the King Alfonso XII of Spain, becoming queen consort of Spain.

However, it enters into its legends that the queen María de las Mercedes, due to her delicate health, spent long periods in the chambers of the castle basking in the sun while sewing with her ladies and also that, in those moments, she received visits from Alfonso XII, who came on horseback from the Alcázar of Seville after attending to his state affairs. This, however, would be impossible, because the building was built in 1893 and the queen died in 1878.

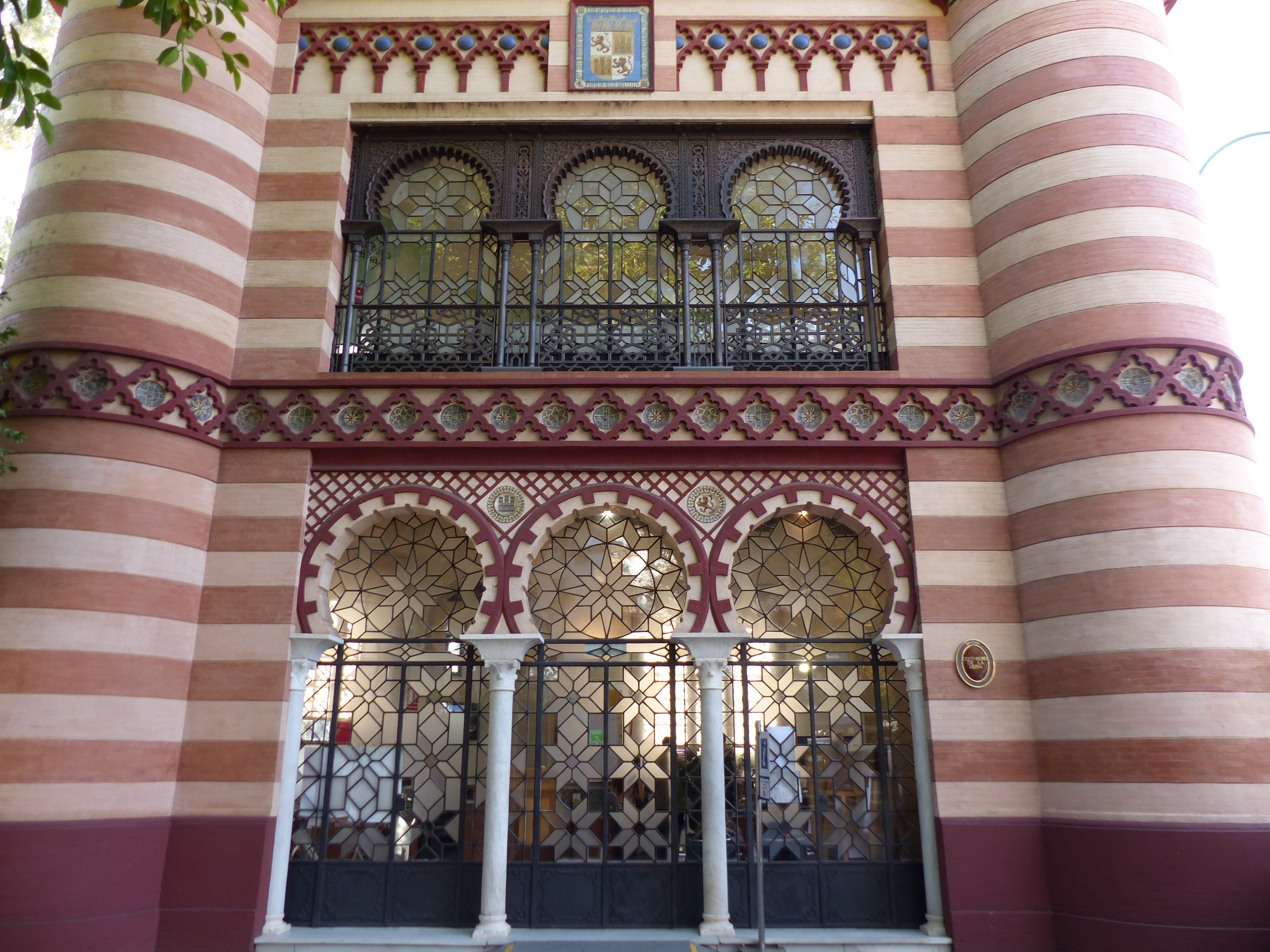

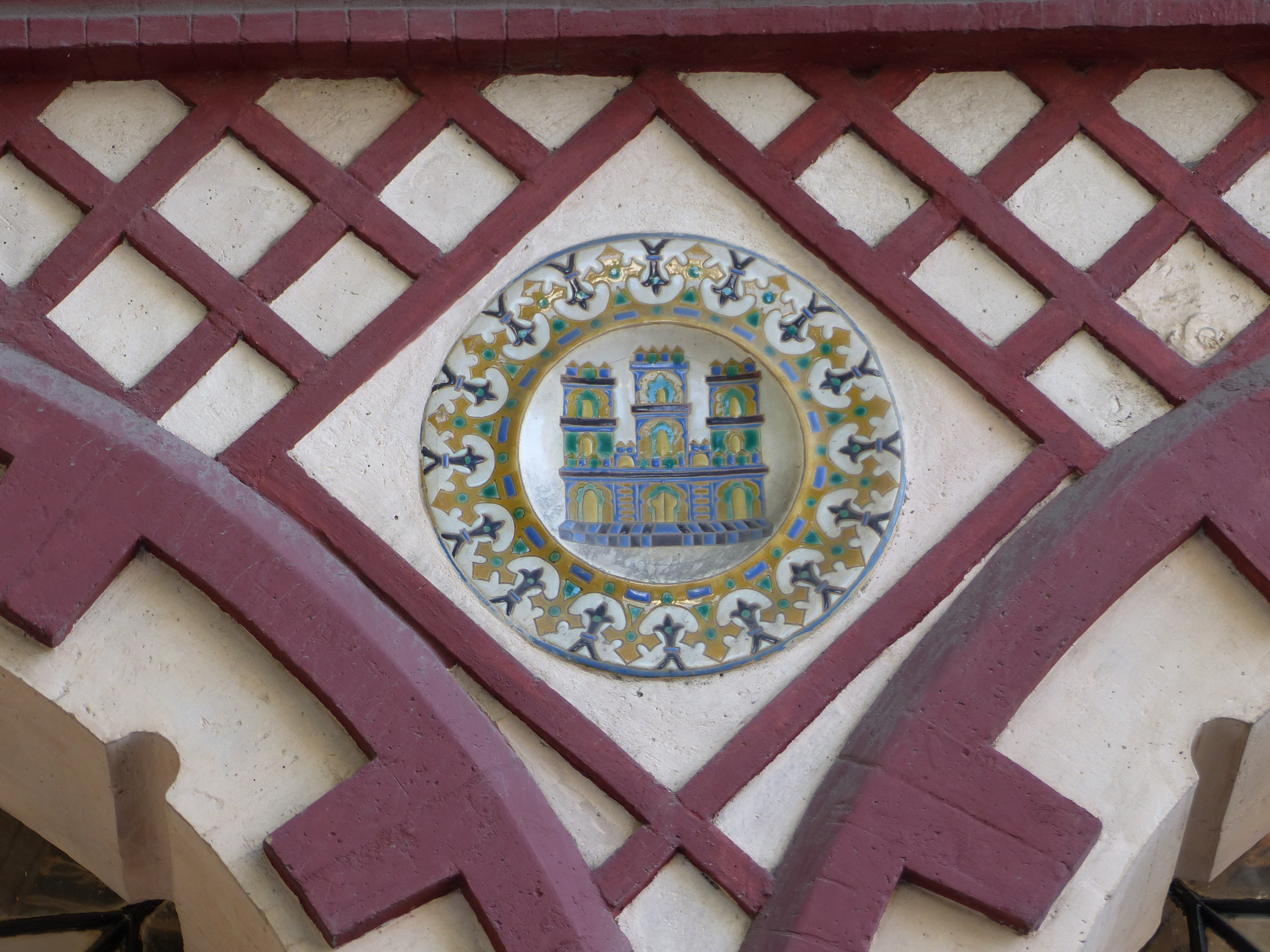
