= Palacio de San Telmo =

Palace of San Telmo
- Palacio de San Telmo (Spanish)
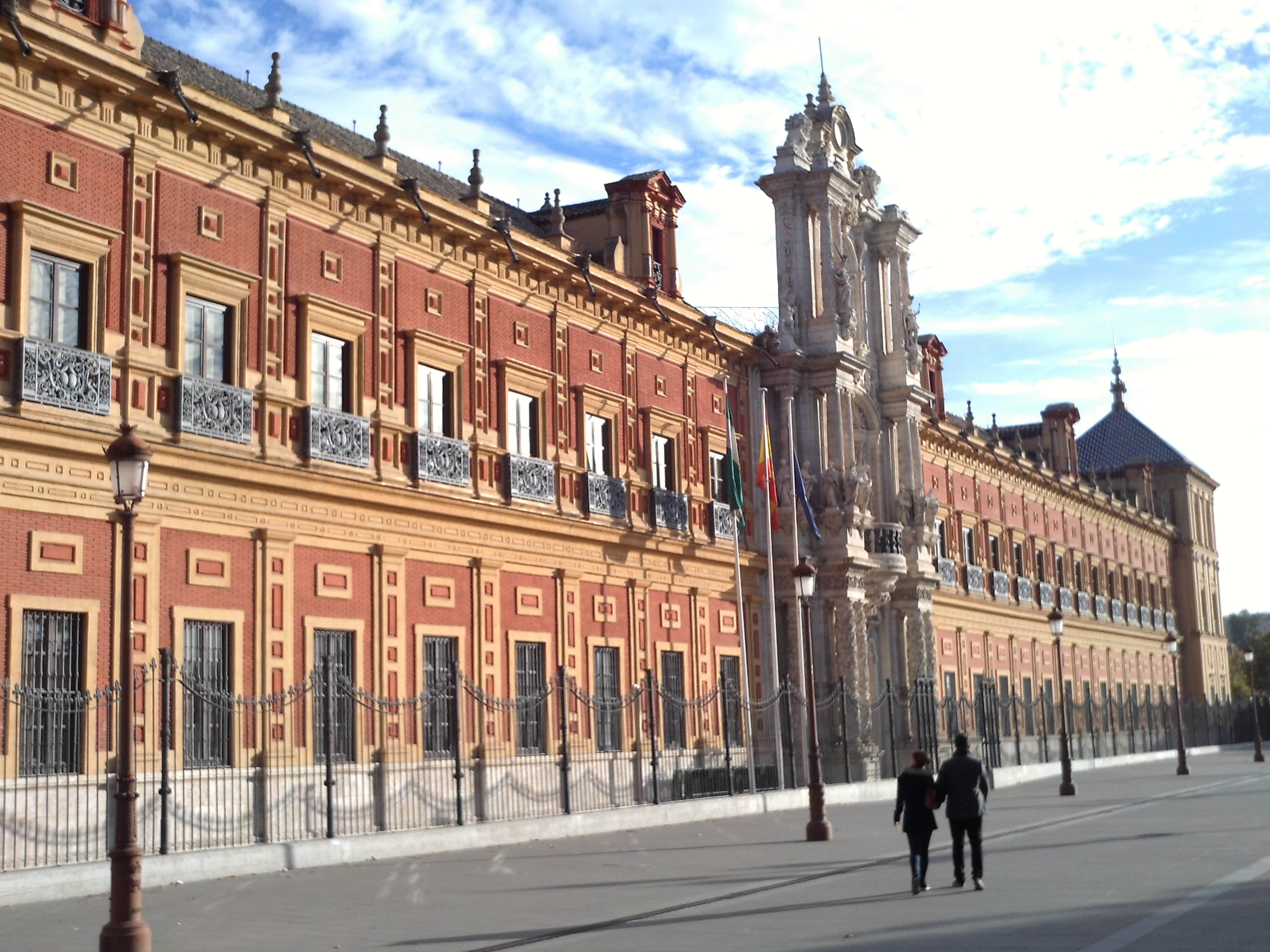
- General view of the Palace of San Telmo.
- Interactive map of Palace of San Telmo

General information
- Architectural style: Spanish Baroque
- Location: Seville, Spain
- Coordinates: 37°22′49″N 5°59′37″W

Design and construction
- Architect: Leonardo de Figueroa

Spanish Cultural Heritage
- Official name: Palacio de San Telmo con el Jardín contiguo al mismo
- Type: Non-movable
- Criteria: Monument
- Designated: 6 April 1968
- Reference no.: RI-51-0007309

The Palace of San Telmo (Spanish: Palacio de San Telmo) is a historic edifice in Seville, southern Spain, formerly the Universidad de Mareantes (a university for navigators), now the seat of the presidency of the Andalusian Autonomous Government. Construction of the building began in 1682 outside the walls of the city, on property belonging to the Tribunal of the Holy Office, the institution responsible for the Spanish Inquisition. It was originally constructed as the seat of the University of Navigators (Universidad de Mareantes), a school to educate orphaned children and train them as sailors.

== Description ==
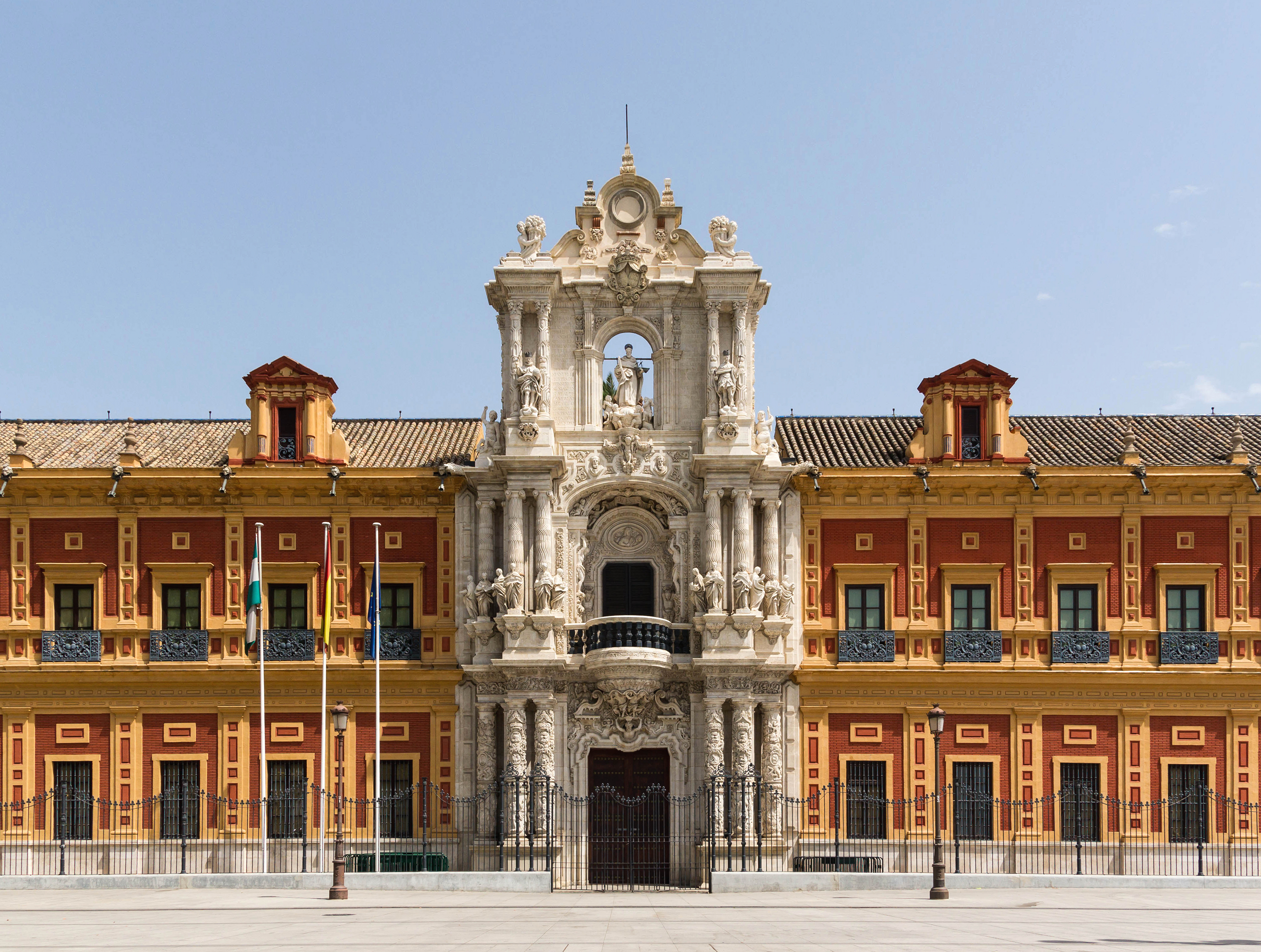
Palace of San Telmo. Main façade (b. 1754).

The palace is one of the emblematic buildings of Sevillian Baroque architecture. It is built on a rectangular plan, with several interior courtyards, including a central courtyard, towers on the four corners, a chapel, and gardens. The exuberantly baroque chapel, accessed from one of the courtyards, is the work of architect Leonardo de Figueroa; among those involved in its decoration were sculptor Pedro Duque y Cornejo, stonecutter Miguel de Quintana, painter Domingo Martínez, and carpenter Juan Tomás Díaz. Presiding over the chapel is an early 17th-century statue of Nuestra Señora del Buen Aire ("Our Lady of Good Air").

=== Exterior ===
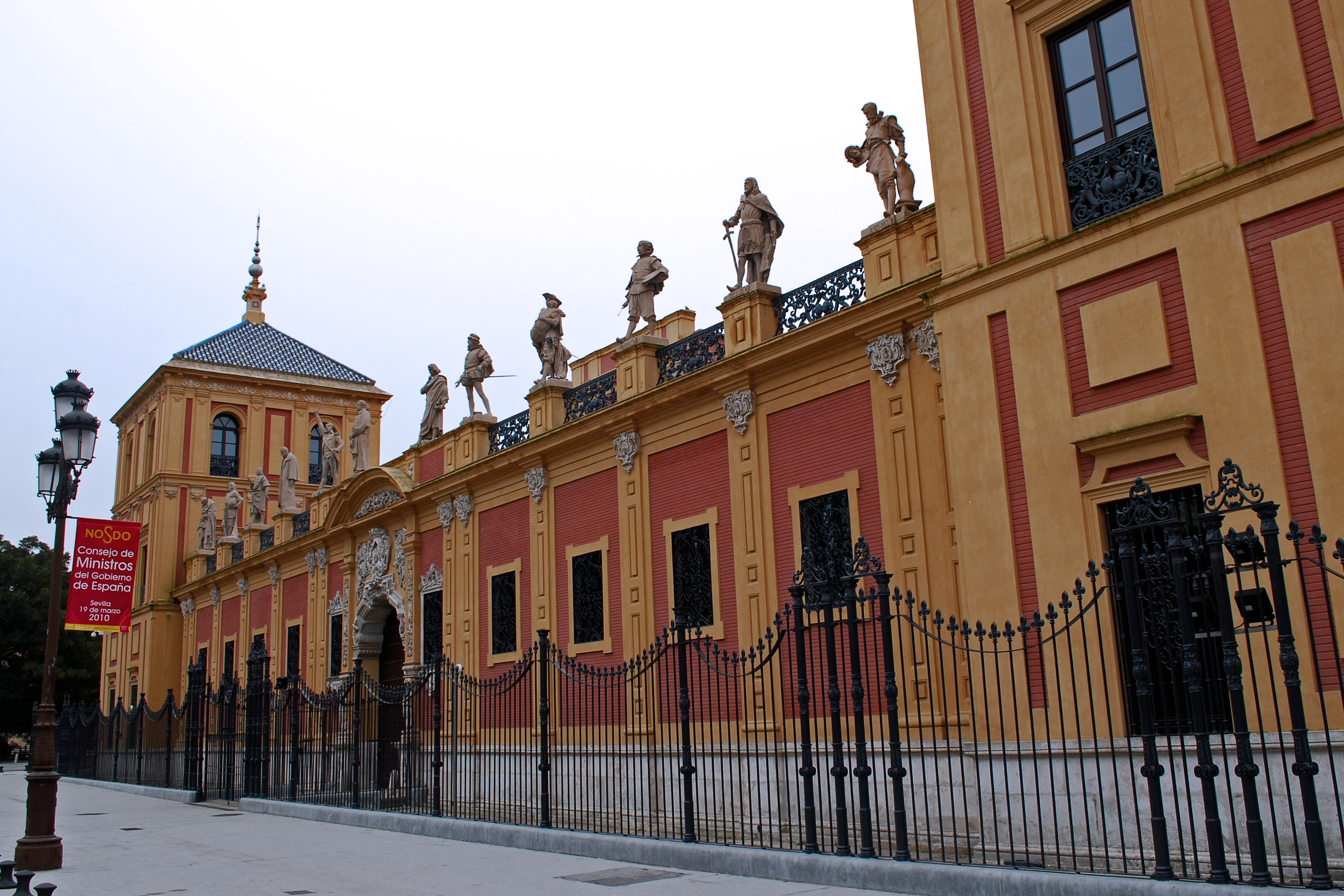
Gallery of illustrious Sevillians, on the façade facing Calle Palos de la Frontera.

The main façade of the palace is distinguished by the magnificent Churrigueresque entrance completed in 1754, the work of other members of the Figueroa family, specifically Matías and Antonio Matías, son and grandson of Leonardo de Figueroa, at a cost of 50,000 pesos. The entryway consists of several parts. The door is flanked by three columns on each side. Over the door is a balcony supported by Atlantes (supports sculpted in the form of a man); twelve allegorical female figures represent the nautical arts and sciences. Finally, there is a sculptural grouping with columns and a figure of Peter González, Saint Telmo (or Elmo), patron saint of sailors, flanked by the patron saints of the city: Saint Ferdinand (Ferdinand III of Castile) and Saint Hermenegild.

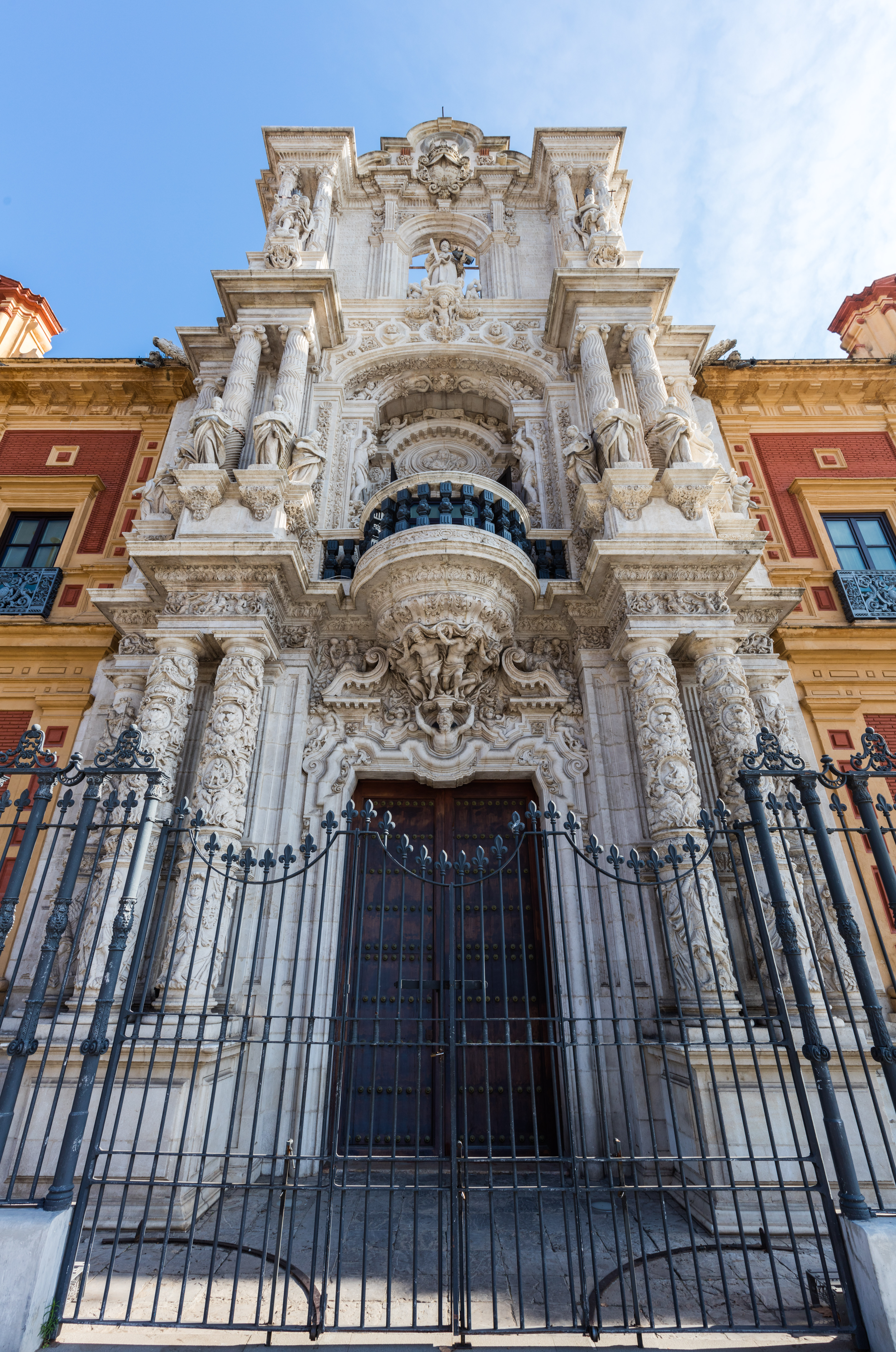
Main façade entrance seen bottom-up.

Atop the façade facing Calle Palos de la Frontera, across from the Hotel Alfonso XIII, are sculptures of twelve illustrious Sevillians, sculpted in 1895 by Antonio Susillo. The twelve figures are:

- Juan Martínez Montañés, sculptor.
- Rodrigo Ponce de León, Marquess of Cádiz and Captain General of the Reconquista of Granada.
- Diego Rodríguez de Silva y Velázquez, painter.
- Miguel Mañara, Knight and philanthropist, founder of Seville's Hospital de la Caridad.
- Lope de Rueda, writer.
- Fernando de Herrera, poet.
- Luis Daoíz, military officer, hero of the Spanish War of Independence (Peninsular War).
- Benito Arias Montano, humanist.
- Bartolomé Esteban Murillo, painter.
- Fernando Afán de Ribera y Enríquez, Duke of Alcalá, humanist.
- Bartolomé de las Casas, monk, bishop of Chiapas, Mexico and protector of the Indians.

Three of these were Sevillians "by adoption", born elsewhere, but who lived and died in Seville: Benito Arias Montano was born in Fregenal de la Sierra (province of Badajoz), Rodrigo Ponce de León in Cádiz, and Juan Martínez Montañés in Alcalá la Real (province of Jaén). The gardens included the Queen's sewing box (Costurero de la Reina), built in 1893 and now in the Parque de María Luisa. This unique building takes the form of a small hexagonal castle with turrets at the corners. It is the oldest building in Seville in the neomudéjar style.

== History ==
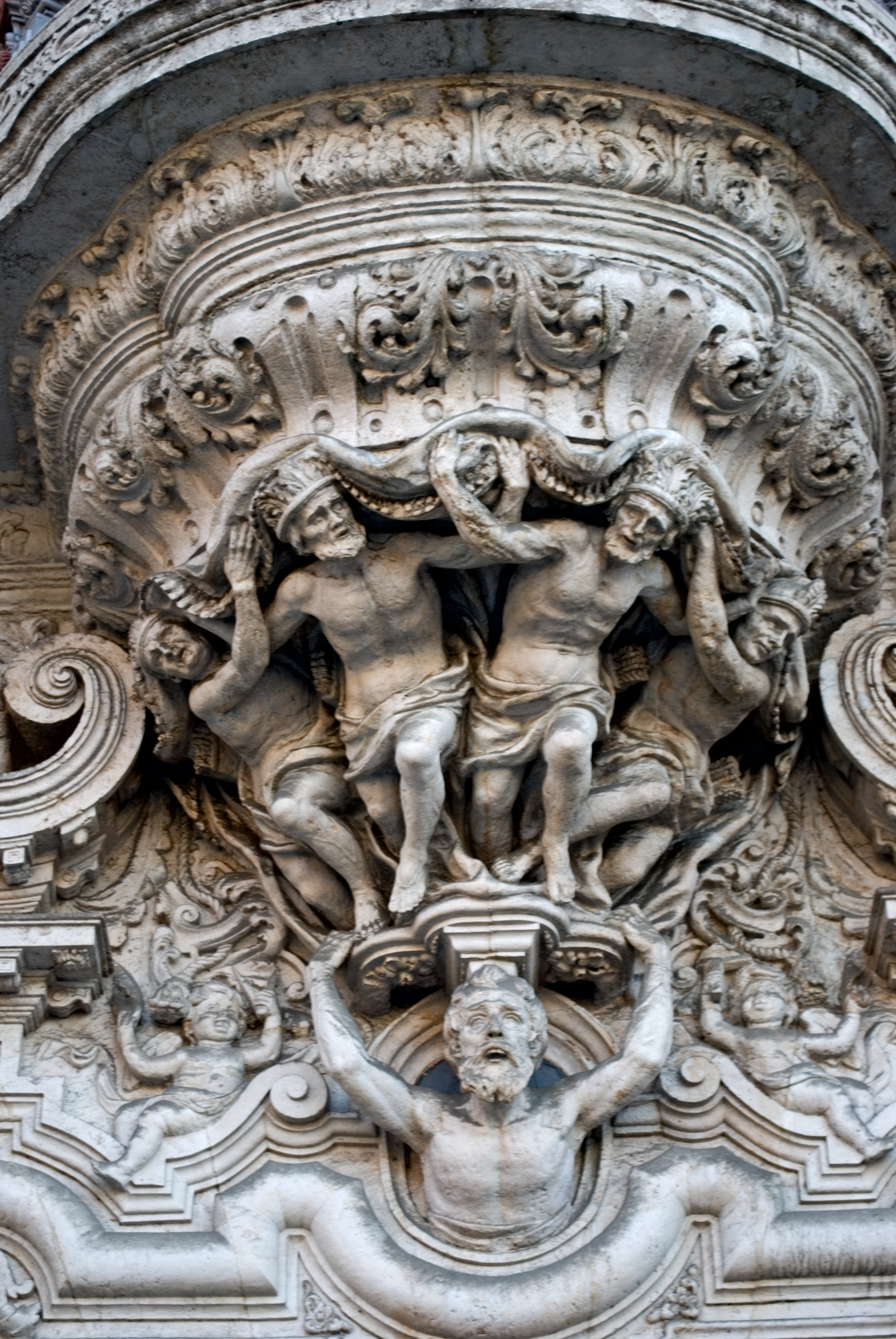
Detail of the main facade

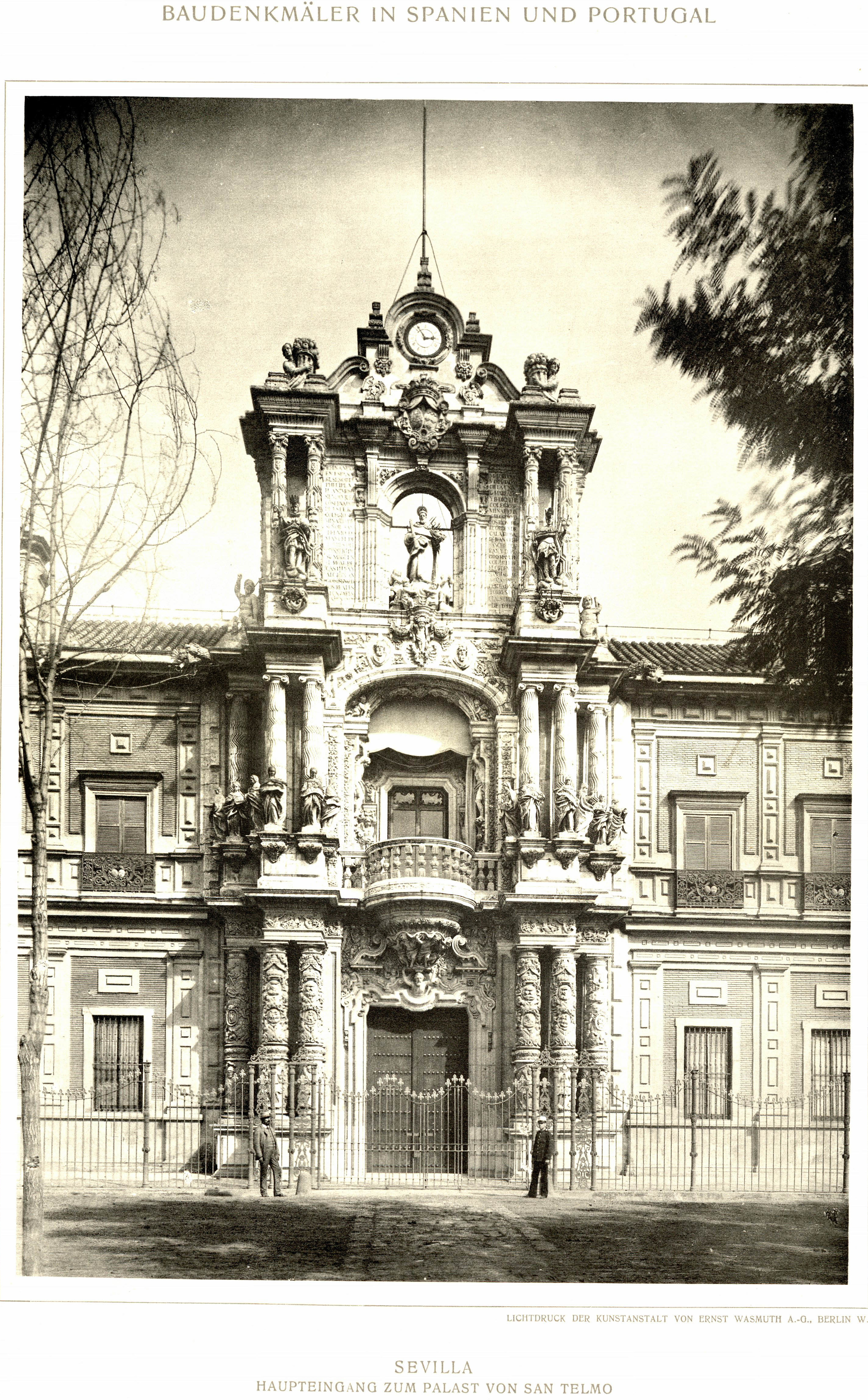
Photo of 1892, main facade entrance

On 10 March 1682 construction began on the building, dedicated to the University of Navigators (Universidad de Mareantes), an institution that later was called Colegio de Marina and then Colegio de Naútica, a role in which it continued until 1847. Thereafter, the building had a number of uses. First, briefly, it was the headquarters of the Railway Society (Sociedad del Ferrocarril, dedicated to the development of Spain's then nascent railways) and site of the Literary University (Universidad Literaria), but was underutilized and these groups could not afford the upkeep. In 1849 it was bought by Antoine, Duke of Montpensier a son of King Louis Philippe of France, exiled from France after the revolutions of 1848, who converted it into their official residence. The dukedom were not well received in the Spanish Court because Duke claimed for his wife part of the inheritance of Ferdinand VII. Upon the death in 1897 of Infanta Luisa Fernanda, Duchess of Montpensier, the palace was willed to the Archdiocese of Seville; its gardens, which now constitute the Parque de María Luisa, a park site of the Ibero-American Exposition of 1929, were willed to the city of Seville.

In 1901, while Marcelo Spínola was Archbishop of Seville, the palace was converted into a seminary. It remained so until 1989, when the arch-episcopate of Seville ceded the building to the Andalusian Autonomous Government to be the new seat of the presidency.

=== Rehabilitation ===
Work began in 1991 to convert the building for use as the official seat of the presidency of the Andalusian Autonomous Government. In 2005, a second phase of restoration took place. It focused on restoring the parts of the 18th and 19th centuries and reforming elements of low architectural value and poor quality of materials made in the 20th century by Basterra y Sagastizábal.
