= Parque de María Luisa =

Public park in Sevilla, Spain

Maria Luisa Park
- Parque de María Luisa
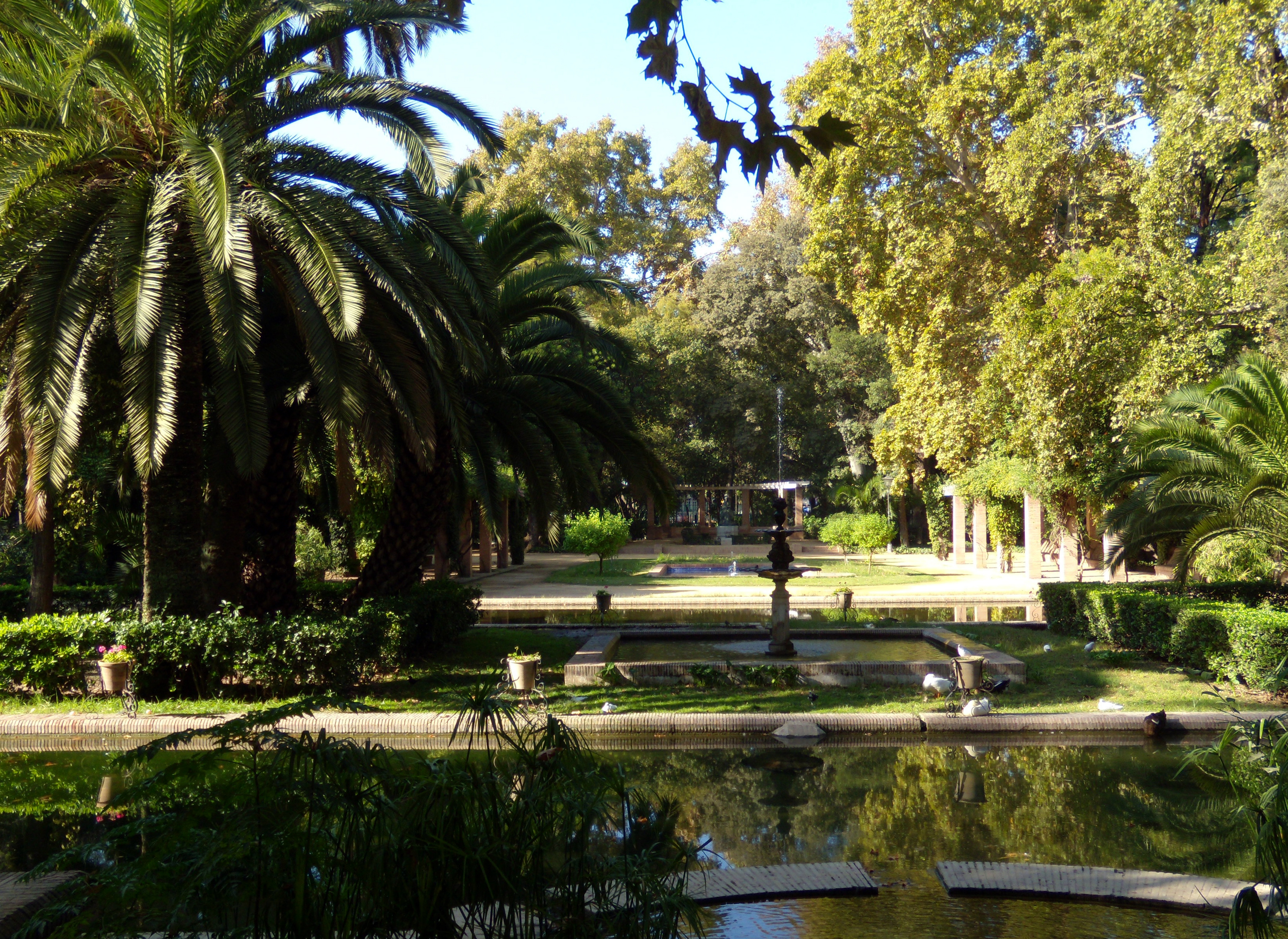
- Interactive map of Maria Luisa Park
- Type: Public park
- Location: Seville, Spain
- Coordinates: 37°22′29″N 5°59′19″W
- Area: 40 hectares (99 acres)
- Created: 1911
- Designer: Jean-Claude Nicolas Forestier
- Manager: City Council of Seville
- Status: Open year round

Spanish Cultural Heritage
- Type: Non-movable
- Criteria: Historic Garden
- Designated: 1 June 1983
- Reference no.: RI-52-0000040

The Parque de María Luisa (María Luisa Park) is a public park that stretches along the Guadalquivir River in Seville, Spain. It is Seville's principal green area.

== History ==
Most of the grounds that were used for the park were formerly the gardens of the Palace of San Telmo. They were donated to the city of Seville in 1893 by the Infanta Luisa Fernanda, Duchess of Montpensier, for use as a public park.

Starting in 1911, Jean-Claude Nicolas Forestier redesigned the gardens into their present shapes. In 1914 the architect Aníbal Gonzalez began construction for the Ibero-American Exposition of 1929, which was held partly within the park.

The new buildings of the Plaza de España, a semi-circle on a plaza, were used as the offices of the fair. They have been used as settings for filmed scenes, including in Lawrence of Arabia (1962).

== Layout ==
Park layout

In preparation for the exhibition, the entire southern end of the city was redeveloped into an expanse of gardens and grand boulevards. The centre of it is Parque de María Luisa, a 'Moorish paradisical style' with a half mile of tiled fountains, pavilions, walls, ponds, benches, and exhedras. There are lush plantings of palms, orange trees, Mediterranean pines, and stylized flower beds with bowers hidden by vines.

The park serves as a botanical garden. Many plant species, native or exotic, are represented, along with educational panels to inform the visitors to the park. Many birds make their home in the park, which is known for its large population of doves (for which a part of the Plaza de América is called the Parque de las Palomas, or Dove Park). There are also many parakeets living in the centre of the park, and ducks and swans in the fountains and lakes. It is amazingly beautiful…

== Monuments ==
The park is home to many monuments and to numerous ponds and fountains. Among the most famous are the Fountain of Lions (Fuente de los Leones) and the Water-lily Pool (Estanque de los Lotos).

=== Monument to Gustavo Adolfo Bécquer ===
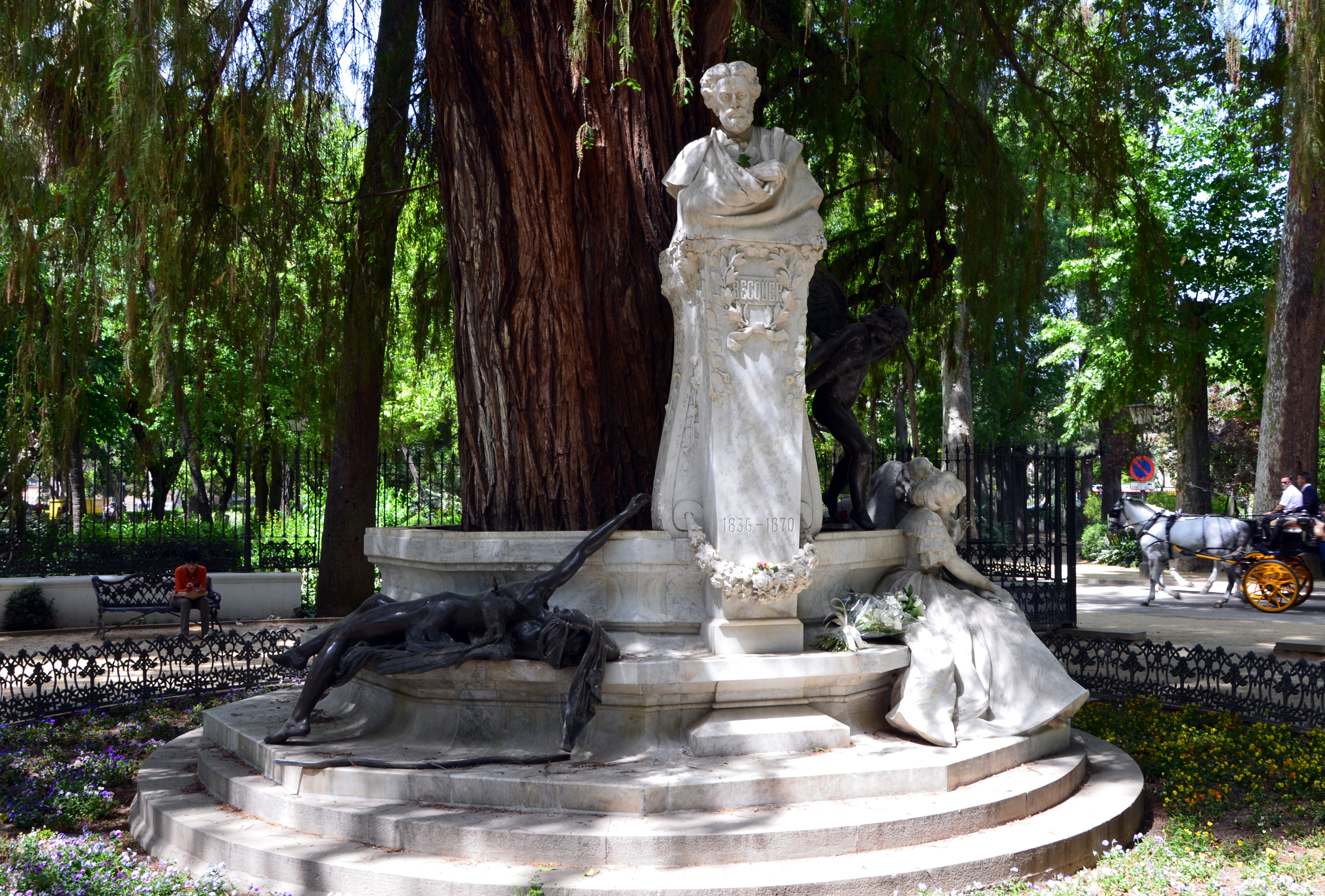
The monument to Bécquer

The monument to Gustavo Adolfo Bécquer is located in the north of the park, along the Avenida de Gustavo Adolfo Becquer. It was constructed in 1911 by Lorenzo Coullaut-Valera, in collaboration with the architect Juan Talavera Heredia and Catalan sculptor Federico Bechini.

The monument consists of an octagonal base, surrounding a tree, which is built on a pedestal, the bust of the poet. To his right is Cupid as a child throwing arrows at three young women. To the left of the bust is Cupid as an adult, stabbed and dying. The two angels are in bronze, the rest of the work is in marble white. This scene is inspired by Becquer's poetry collection Rimas.

=== Monument to Miguel de Cervantes ===
The monument to Miguel de Cervantes is located on the Plaza de America, near the Royal Pavilion. It was created in 1913 by the architect responsible for the Ibero-American Exposition, Aníbal González, in collaboration with Manuel Ramos Rejano and Eduardo Muñoz. The monument is a polygonal space decorated with tiles depicting scenes from the works of Cervantes. Two statuettes, representing Don Quixote on his horse and Sancho Panza on his donkey, were found here for a long time. They have now disappeared.

=== The Fountain of the Lions ===
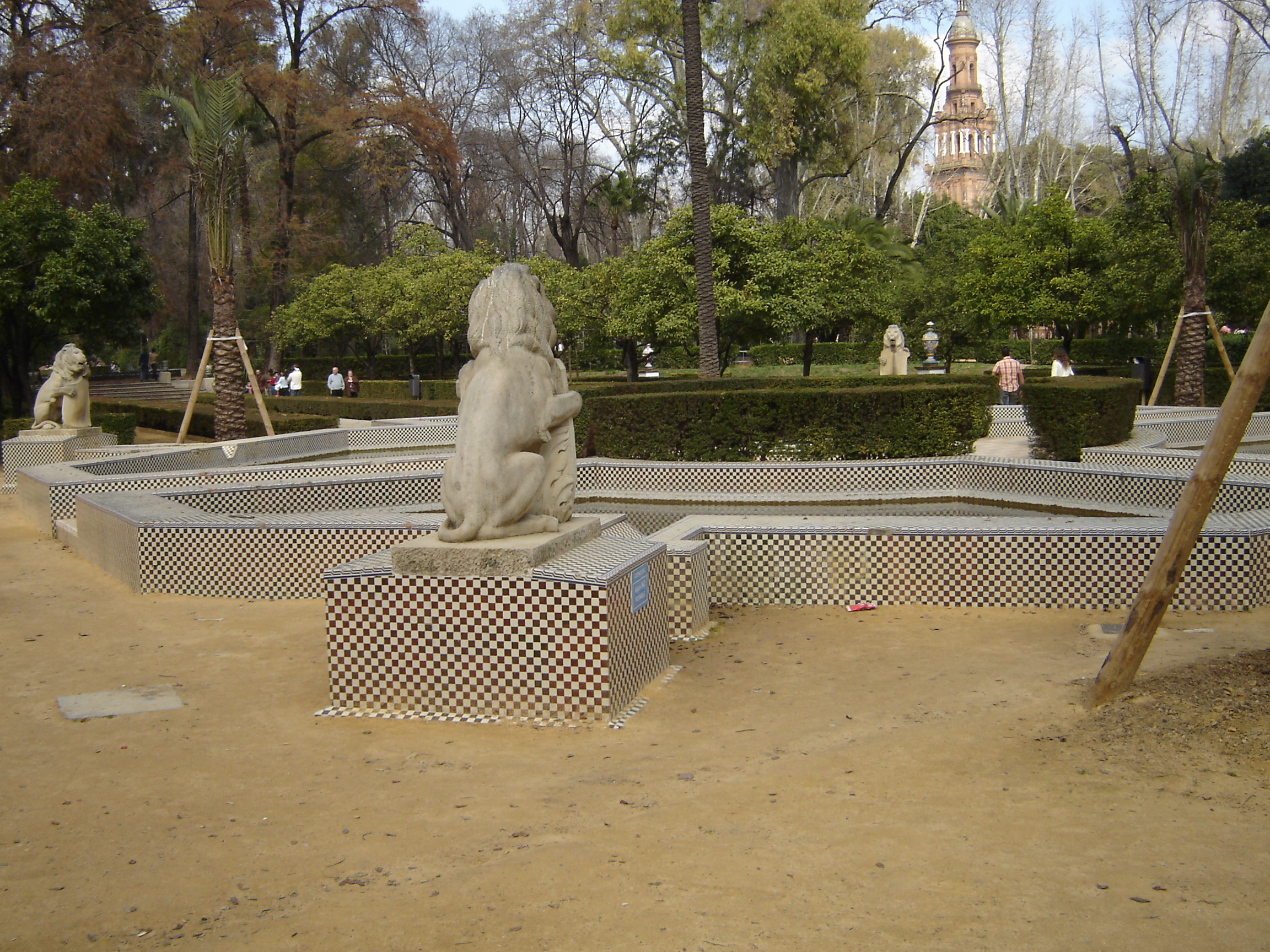
Fuente de los Leones, Fountain of the Lions

The Fountain of the Lions (Fuente de los Leones), based on a concept by the park designer Jean Claude Nicolas Forestier, was sculpted by Manuel Delgado Brackembury in 1913. It consists of four stone lions, each carrying a shield, placed on four of the eight sides of the octagonal fountain into which they spit water. The fountain is decorated with tiles from the workshop of Ramos Rejano. The lions were installed in 1928. Badly damaged by vandals, in 1957 they were replaced by copies made by the Sevillian sculptor Juan Abascal Fuentes. The fountain was restored in 1992.

== Buildings ==
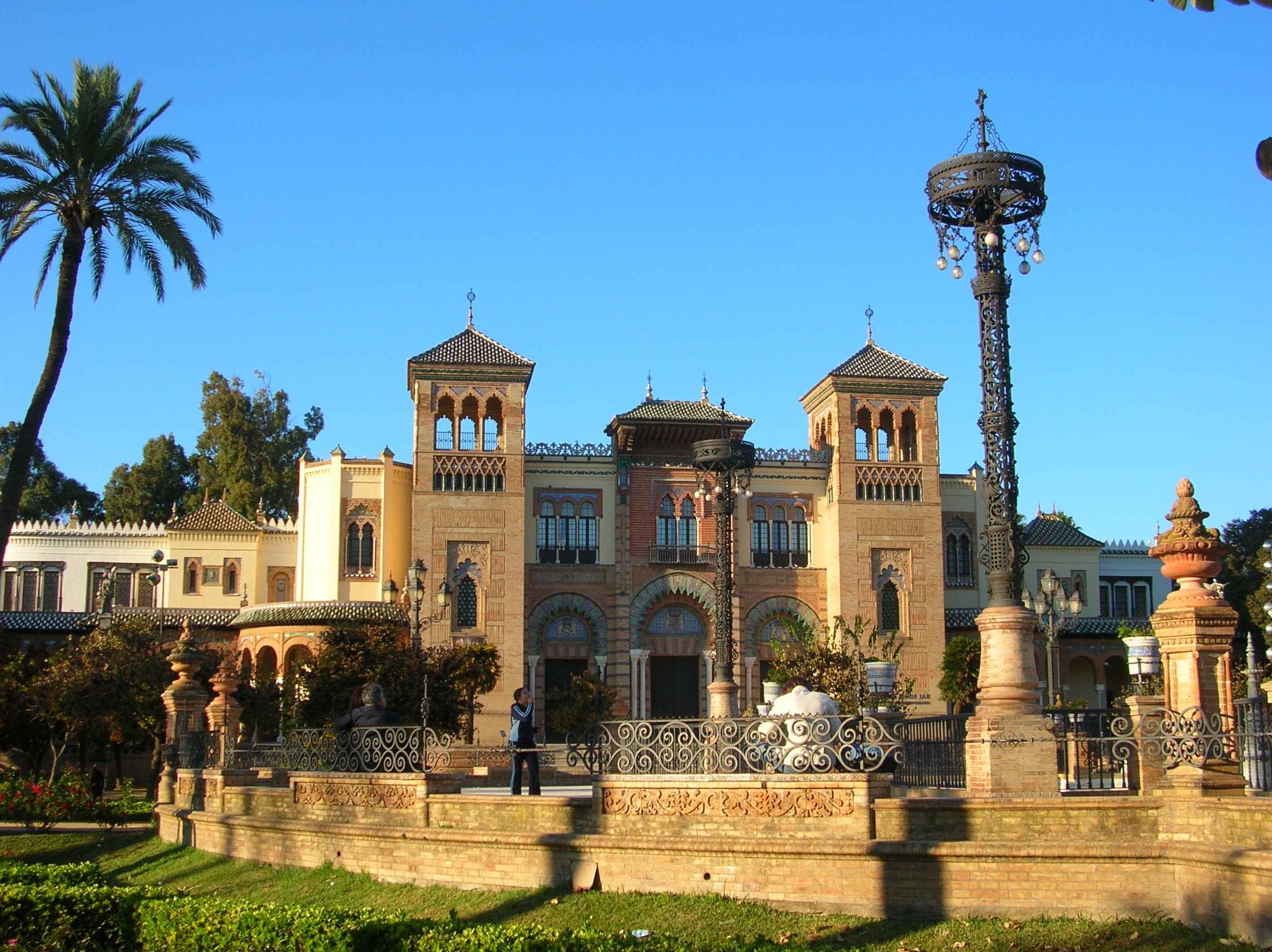
The Mudejar Pavilion, now the Museum of Arts and Traditions of Sevilla

The Plaza de España was a principal building built on the park's edge to showcase Spain's industry and technology exhibits in 1929, being built over a period of 19 years. It happened to be that the US stock market crashed when the complex was being completed. The complex is a huge half-circle with buildings continually running around the edge accessible over the moat by numerous beautiful bridges. In the centre is a large fountain. By the walls of the plaza are many tiled alcoves, each representing a different province of Spain. Today, the plaza buildings are mainly used for government offices.

The Queen's sewing box (Costurero de la Reina) was built in 1893 in the gardens of the Palace of San Telmo, as a retreat. It is a unique building that takes the form of a small hexagonal castle with turrets at the corners. It is the oldest building in Seville in the Neo-Mudéjar style. Numerous other buildings were constructed in and around the park for the exhibition in a mix of 1920's Art Deco and mock Mudejar. Some of them were extravagant in their decor, built just before the Wall Street crash. The Guatemala building, off the Paseo de la Palmera, is an example of this elaborate style. The largest mansions from the fair, near the south end of the park, now serve as museums, including the Archeological Museum of Seville.

Some of the original buildings have been replaced by more modern structures. For example, the Seville Public Library was inaugurated in 1999 by the Infanta Elena, Duchess of Lugo. It was nominated for the Mies van der Rohe Award for European Architecture in 2001. Beside the modern library is the Science Center (Casa de la Ciencia Seville), housed in the original Pavilion of Peru. Adjoining the Science Center is the Teatro Lope de Vega, a small baroque-style theatre that was also built for the exhibition.

== Gallery ==
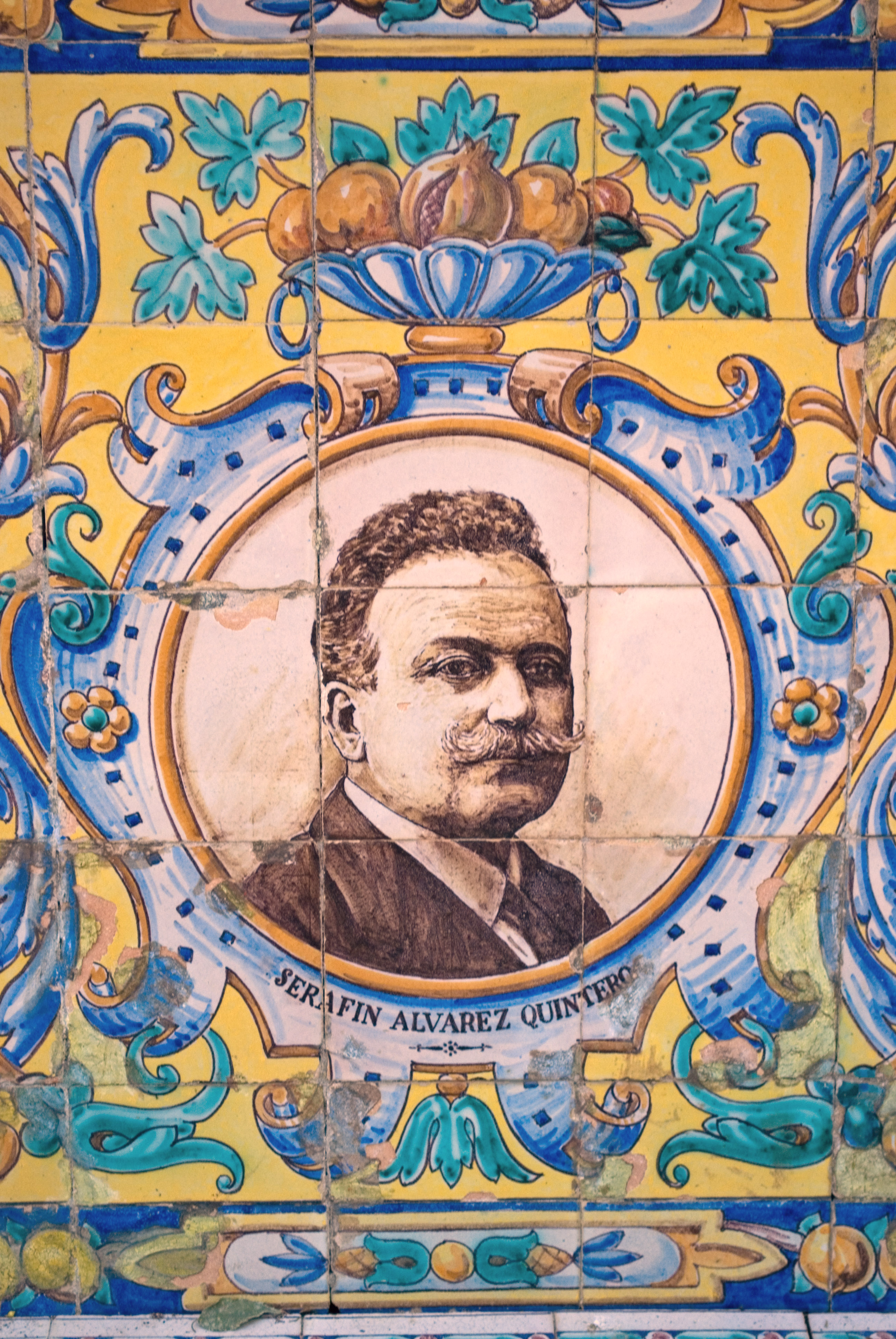
Portrait of Serafín Álvarez Quintero

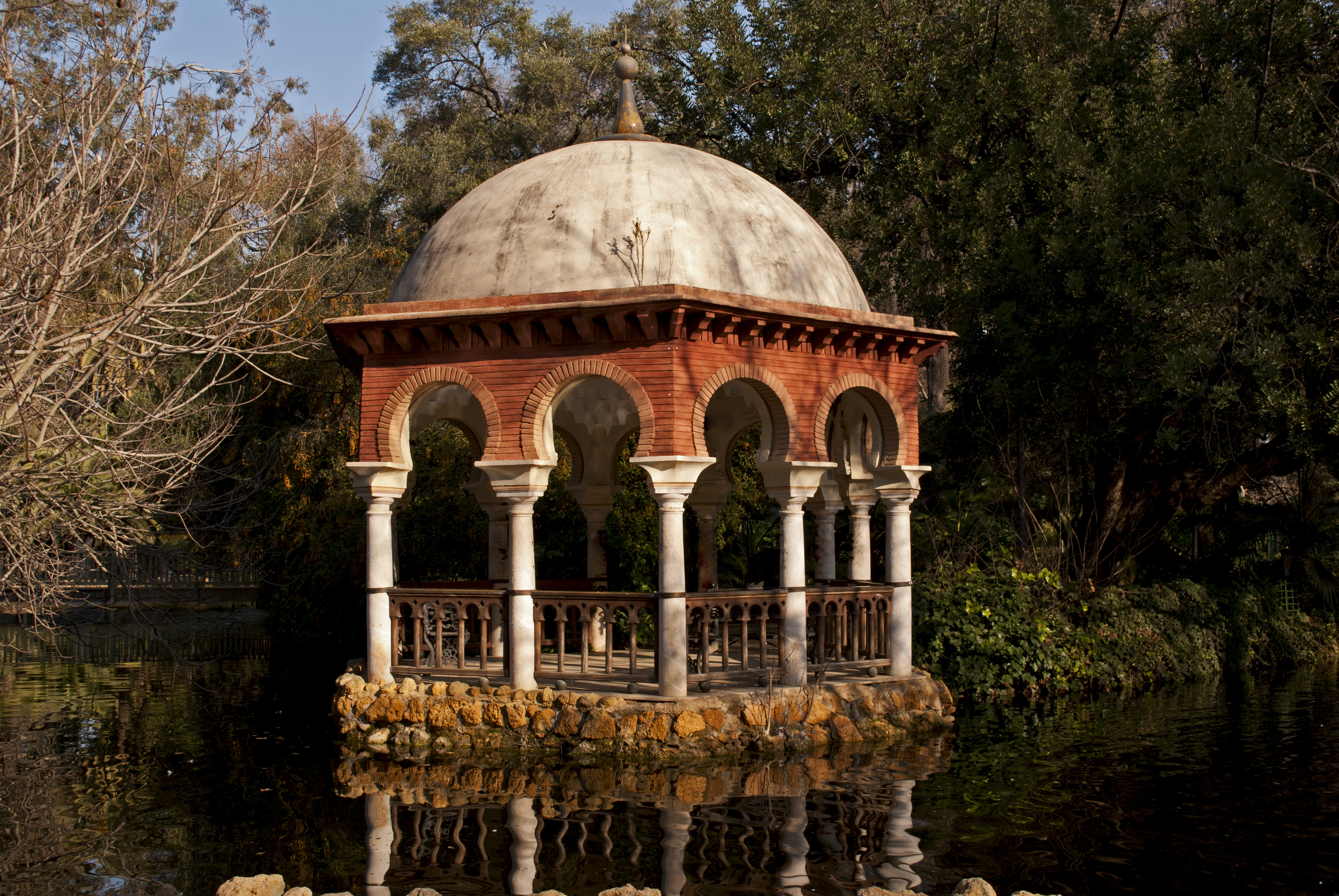
Pavilion of King Alfonso XII of Spain, remains of the gardens of the Palace of San Telmo

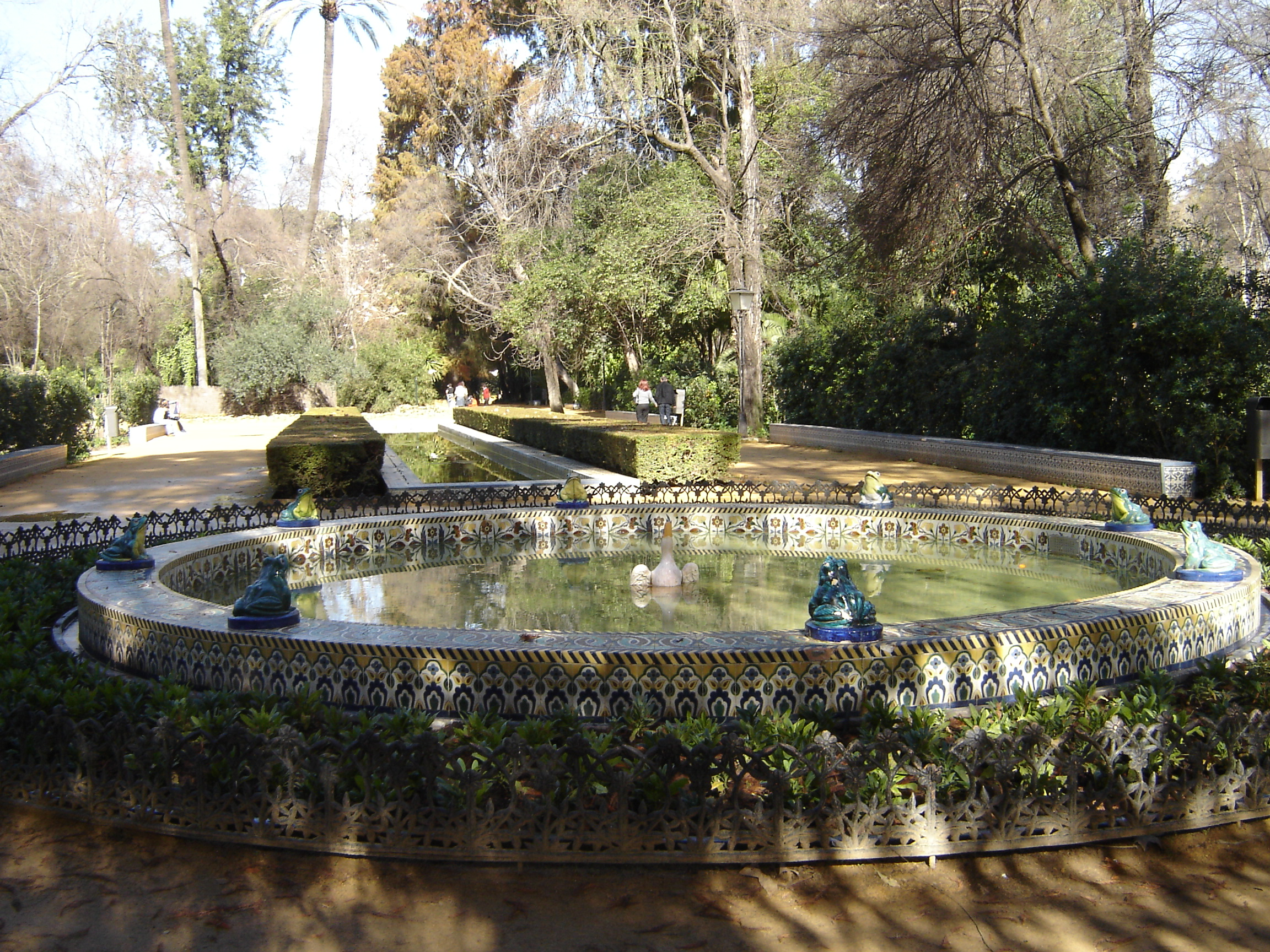
Fuente de las Ranas (Fountain of the frogs)

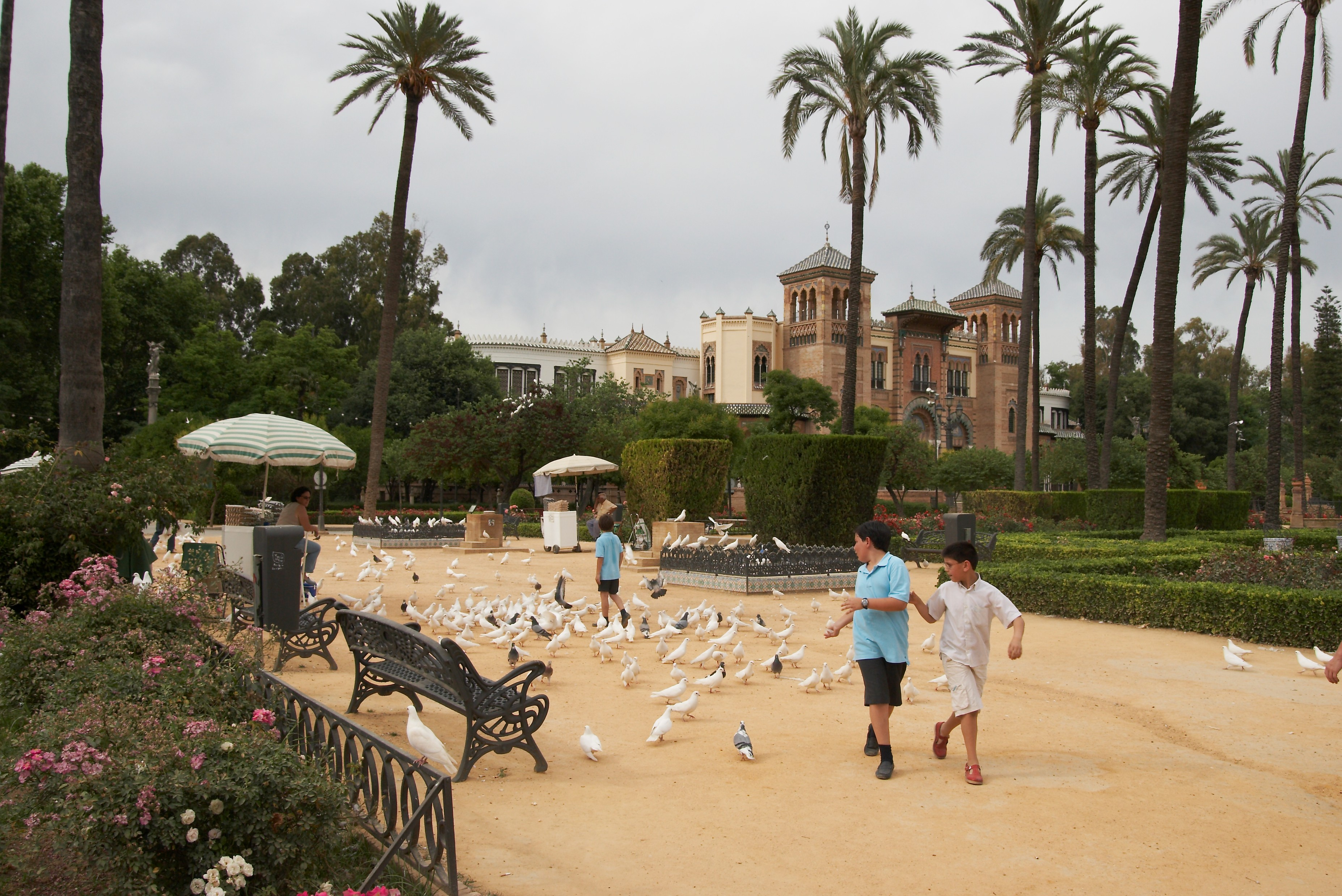
Plaza de América

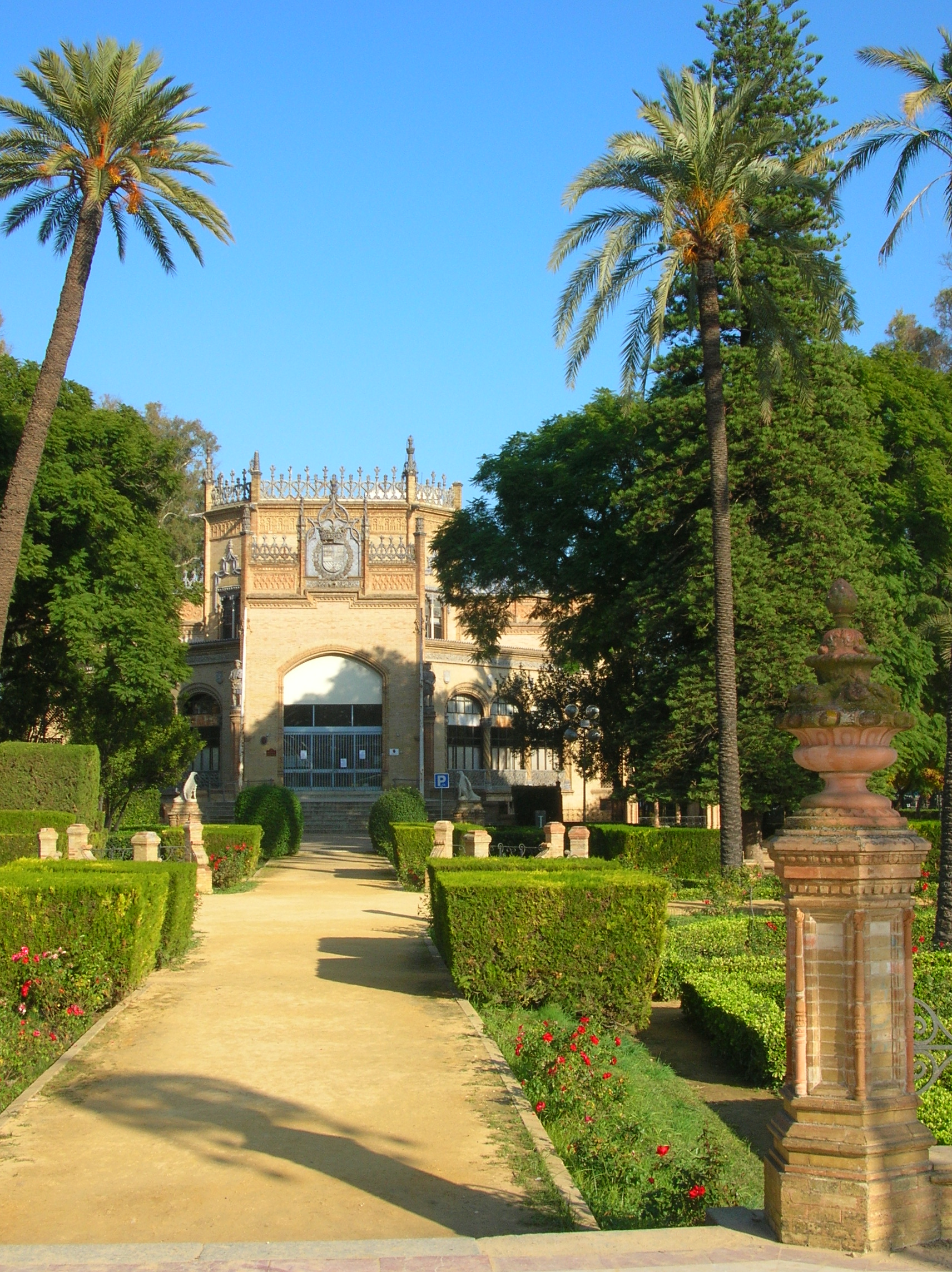
Pavilion Real, in the Plaza América.

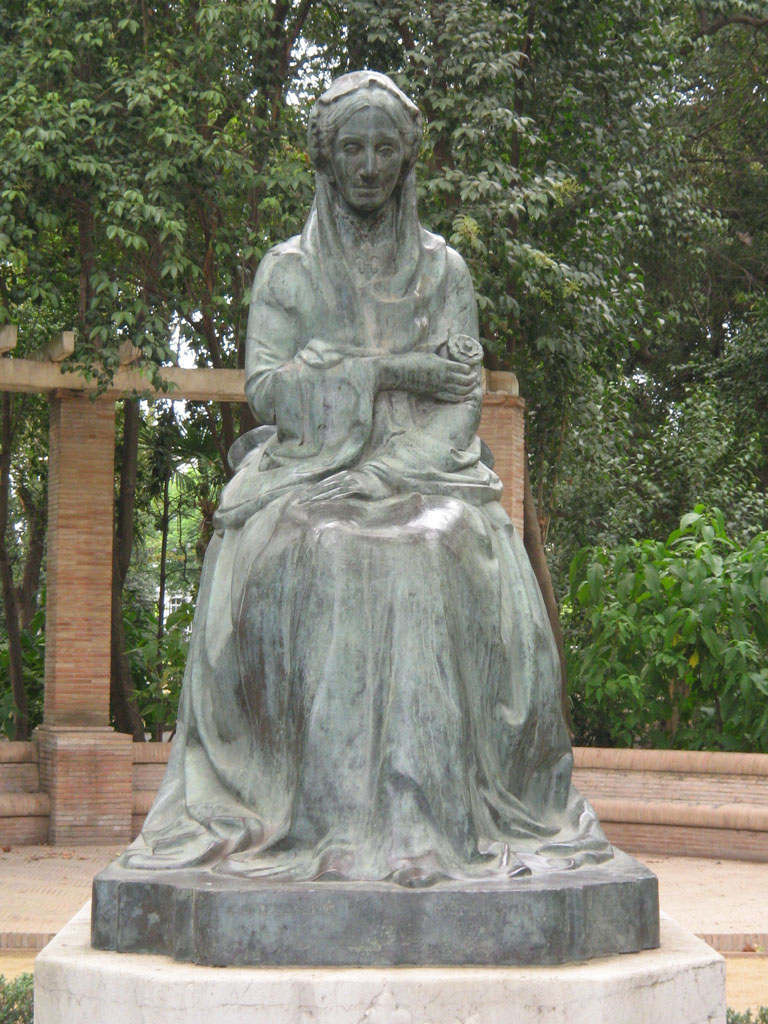
Bronze statue of the princess Luisa Fernanda by Enrique Pérez Comendador

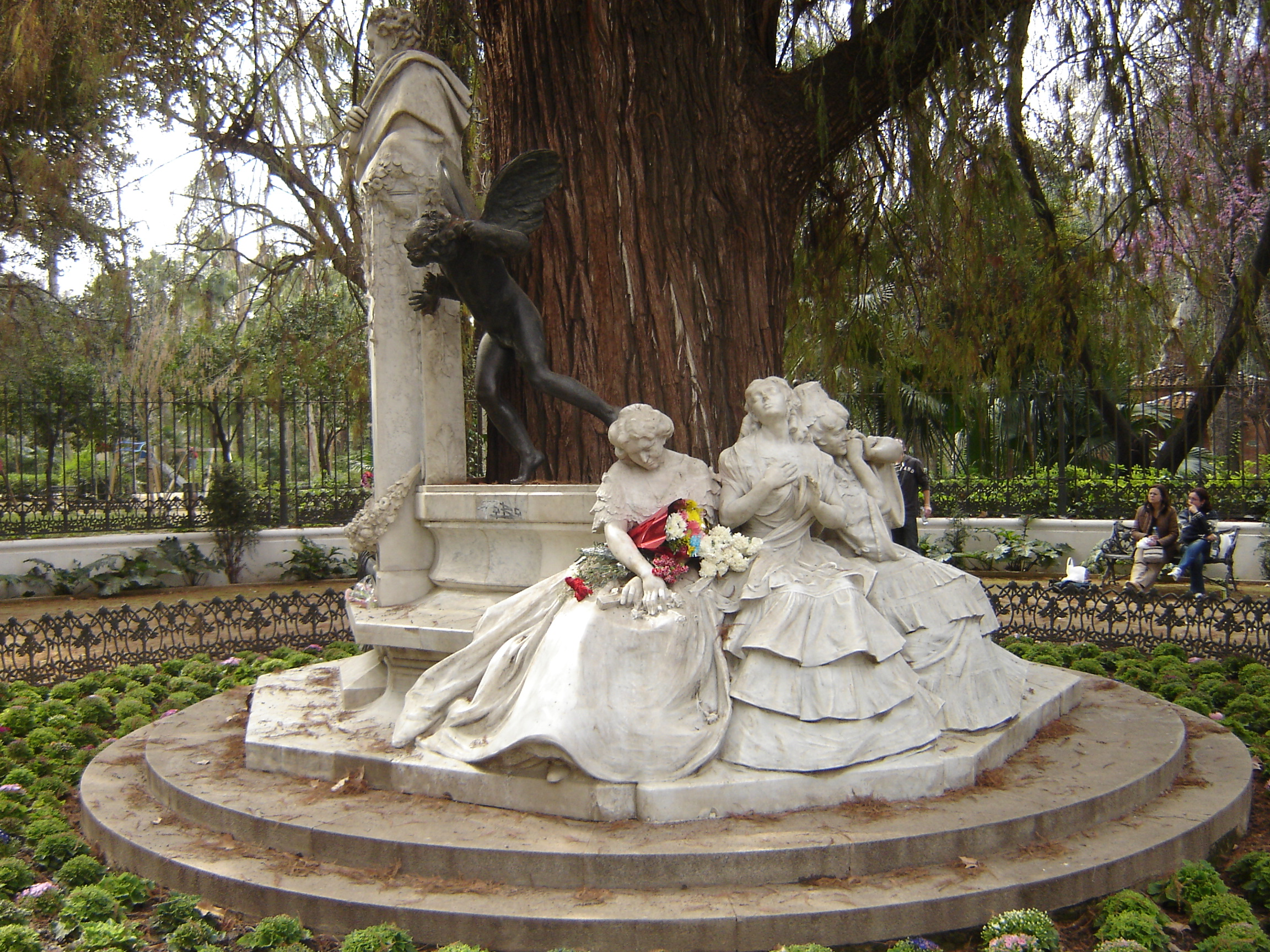
Gloriette to Bécquer
