= Estadio Benito Villamarín =

Stadium in Seville, Spain

Coordinates: 37°21′23″N 5°58′53″W

- Heliópolis
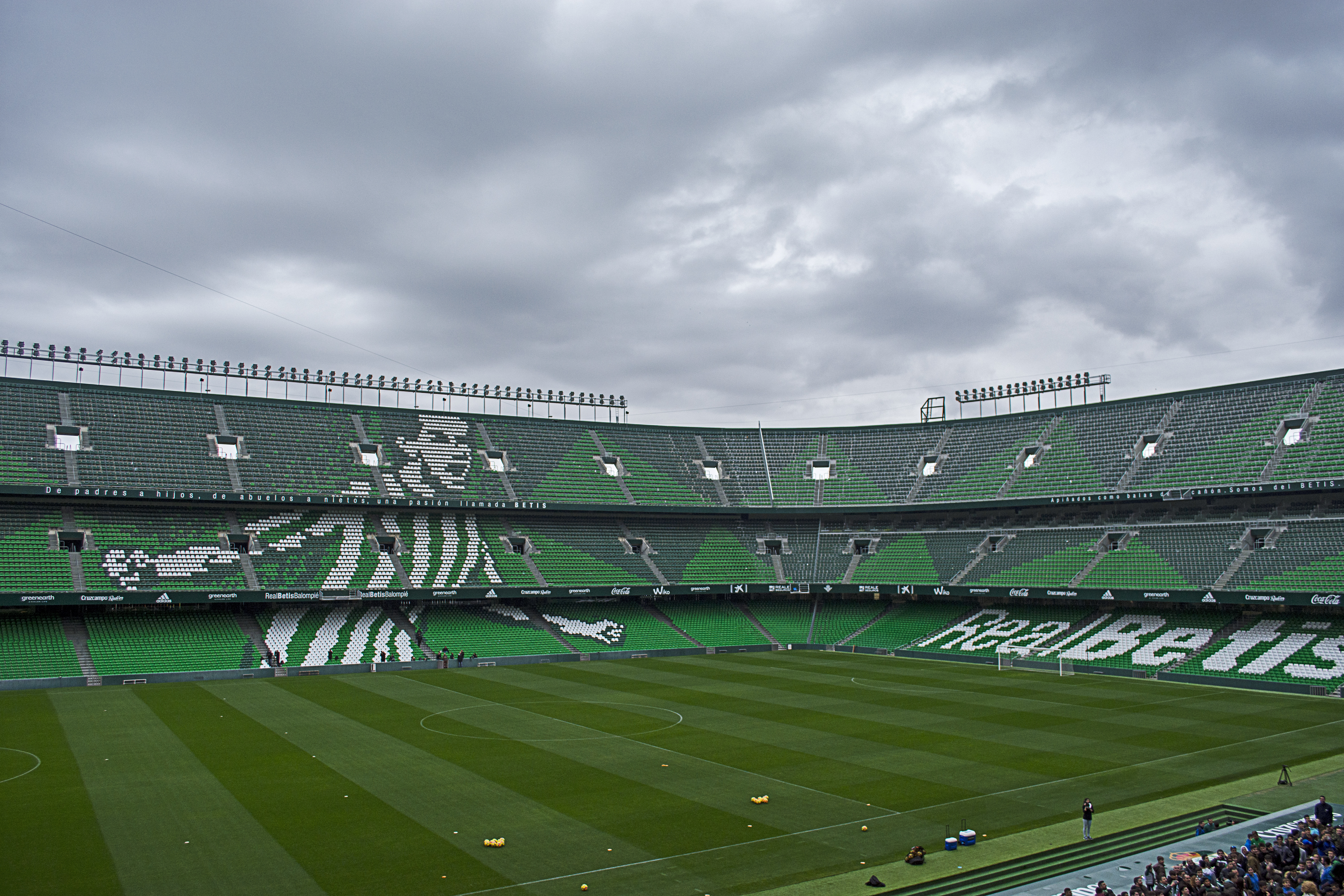
- UEFA
- Interactive map of Estadio Benito Villamarín
- Full name: Estadio Benito Villamarín
- Former names: Estadio Heliópolis (1939–1961); Estadio Manuel Ruiz de Lopera (1997–2010)
- Location: Avenida de Heliópolis, s/n 41012 Seville
- Owner: Real Betis
- Operator: Real Betis
- Capacity: 60,721
- Record attendance: 59,916 (Real Betis v Sociedad; 19 May 2024)

Construction
- Opened: 1929
- Renovated: 2025–
- Expanded: 1982, 2000, 2017

Tenants
- Real Betis (1929–present); Spain national football team (selected matches)

Estadio Benito Villamarín is a stadium in Seville, Spain, and the home of Real Betis since its completion in 1929. It has a capacity of 60,721.

== History ==
=== Construction ===
As early as 1912, the Spanish architect Aníbal González Álvarez-Ossorio had an initial design of a stadium for the Ibero-American Exposition of 1929. The executive committee has commissioned the architect Antonio Illanes del Río to complete the design in 1923. Several locations were considered for the new stadium when finally the current location was chosen by commissar Cruz Conde. The technical study for its construction was carried out by Manuel María Smith who has designed the San Mamés Stadium of Bilbao in 1913. The construction works were launched in 1923 and finally completed by the end of 1928.

=== Inauguration to 1939 ===
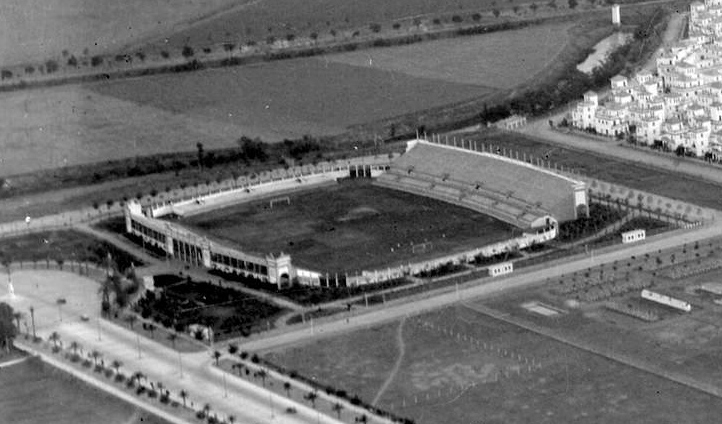
Estadio de la Exposición in 1929

The newly built Estadio de la Exposición was officially inaugurated on 17 March 1929, hosting an international match where Spain defeated Portugal 5-0. In 1936, Real Betis gained the lease of the stadium and became its sole tenant.

During the Spanish Civil War, Seville City Council requisitioned the stadium and handed it over to the military. The stadium suffered major damages as a result of the war and required renovation. The work was carried out with the help of Gonzalo Queipo de Llano, and the stadium was reopened on March 12, 1939.

=== After the Benito Villamarín era ===
In 1958, the extension of the northern and southern stands was carried out by the architect Antonio Delgado y Roig. In 1959 electric lighting was installed with 4 towers of 48 spotlights each.

On 12 August 1961, the stadium became owned property by Real Betis. Few days later, the stadium was renamed after Benito Villamarín who served as the club president between 1955 and 1965. The stadium was blessed by Cardinal José Bueno y Monreal.

Between 1971 and 1973, the northern and southern stands were entirely demolished to be rebuilt. With continuous expansion works during the 1970s, the capacity of the stadium was increased up to 48,500 spectators. However, major renovation works were carried out between 1979 and 1982 for the 1982 FIFA World Cup and the capacity of the stadium was increased up to 50,253. The stadium hosted 2 group matches during the tournament.

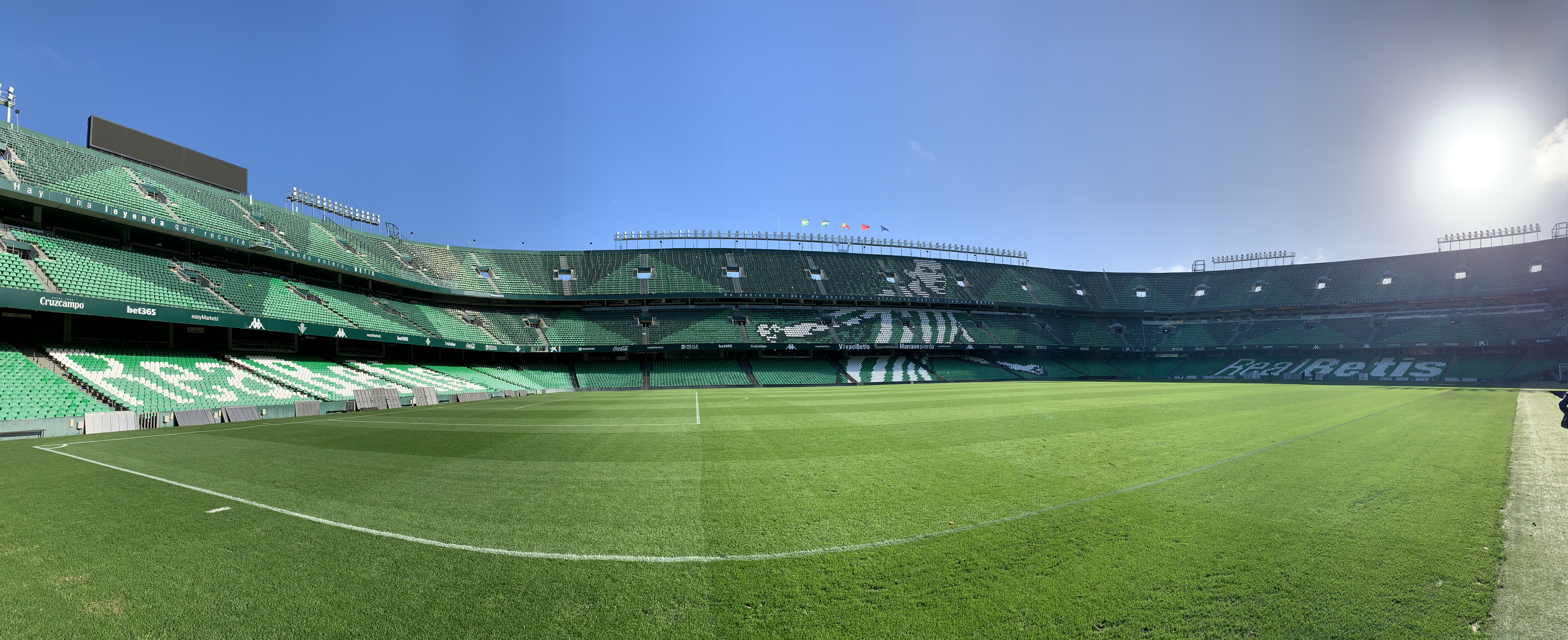
Panorama of the stadium from the pitch level

=== Current status ===
In 1997, the stadium was renamed after the then-club president Manuel Ruiz de Lopera. However in 2010, Real Betis fans voted to change the name of the stadium back to honor former club president Benito Villamarín.

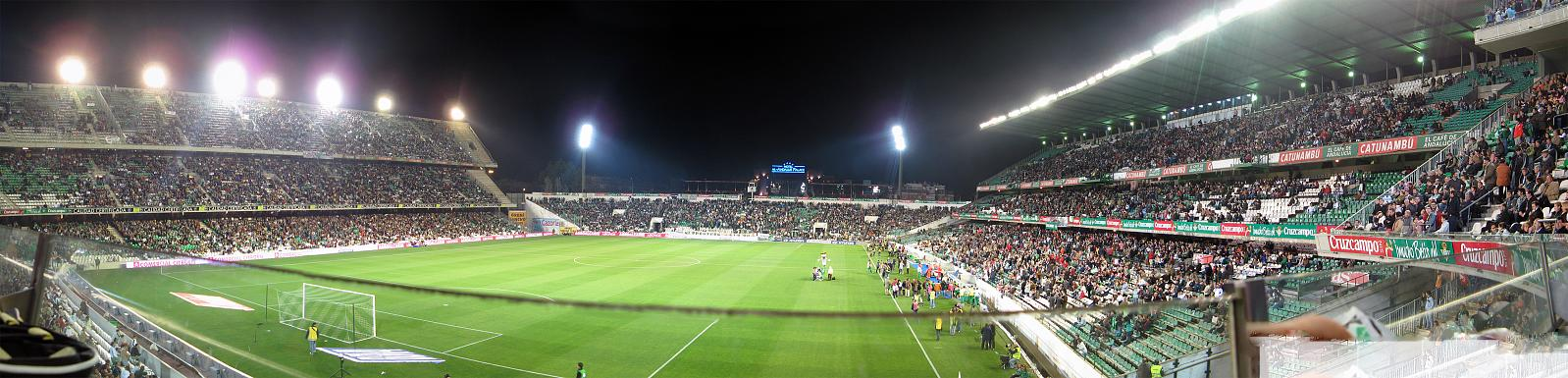
The stadium in 2008

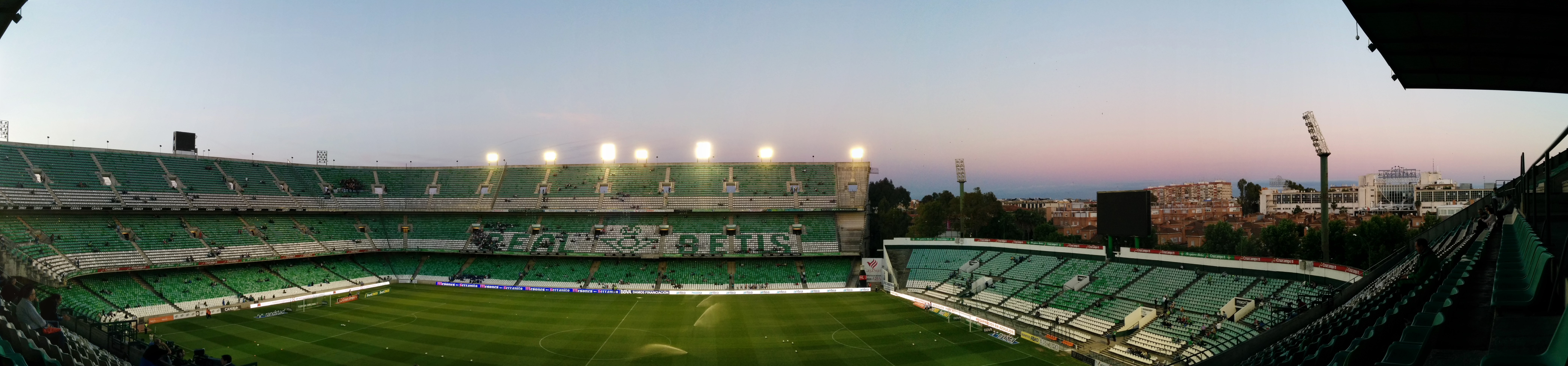
Sunset in Seville over the Estadio Benito Villamarín in 2014

In 2016, the southern stand of the stadium was demolished for expansion. The total capacity of the stadium was increased from 52,000 to 60,721. The expansion work was completed in August 2017 in time for the 2017–18 La Liga season.

In 2025, renovation of the Benito Villamarin main stand began and Betis moved to Estadio de La Cartuja.

== 1982 FIFA World Cup ==
The stadium hosted two group matches in the 1982 FIFA World Cup.

Date	Team #1	Res.	Team #2	Round	Attendance
18 June 1982	Brazil	4–1	Scotland	Group 6	47,379
23 June 1982	Brazil	4–0	New Zealand	Group 6	43,000

== Gallery ==
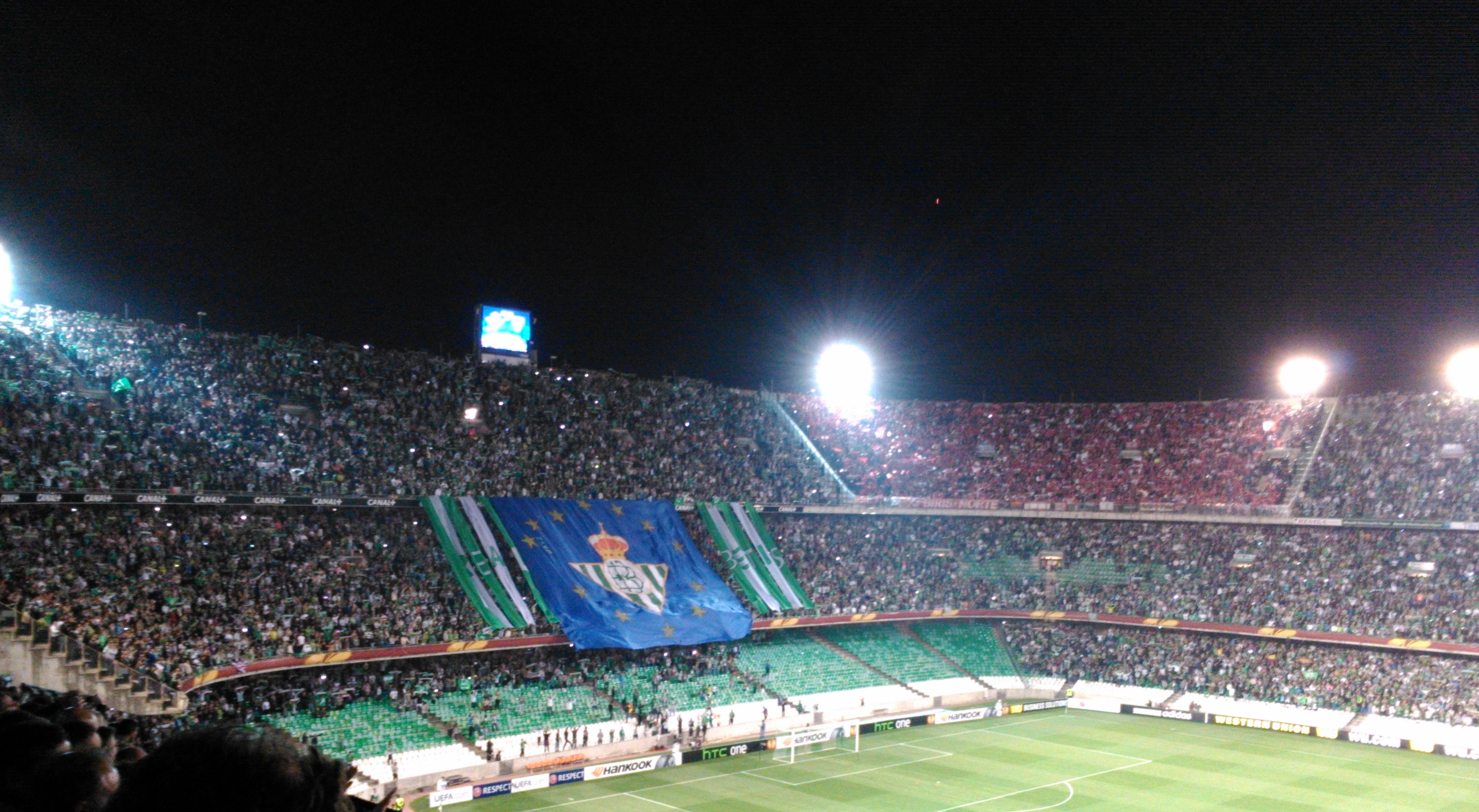
Estadio Benito Villamarín in 2014

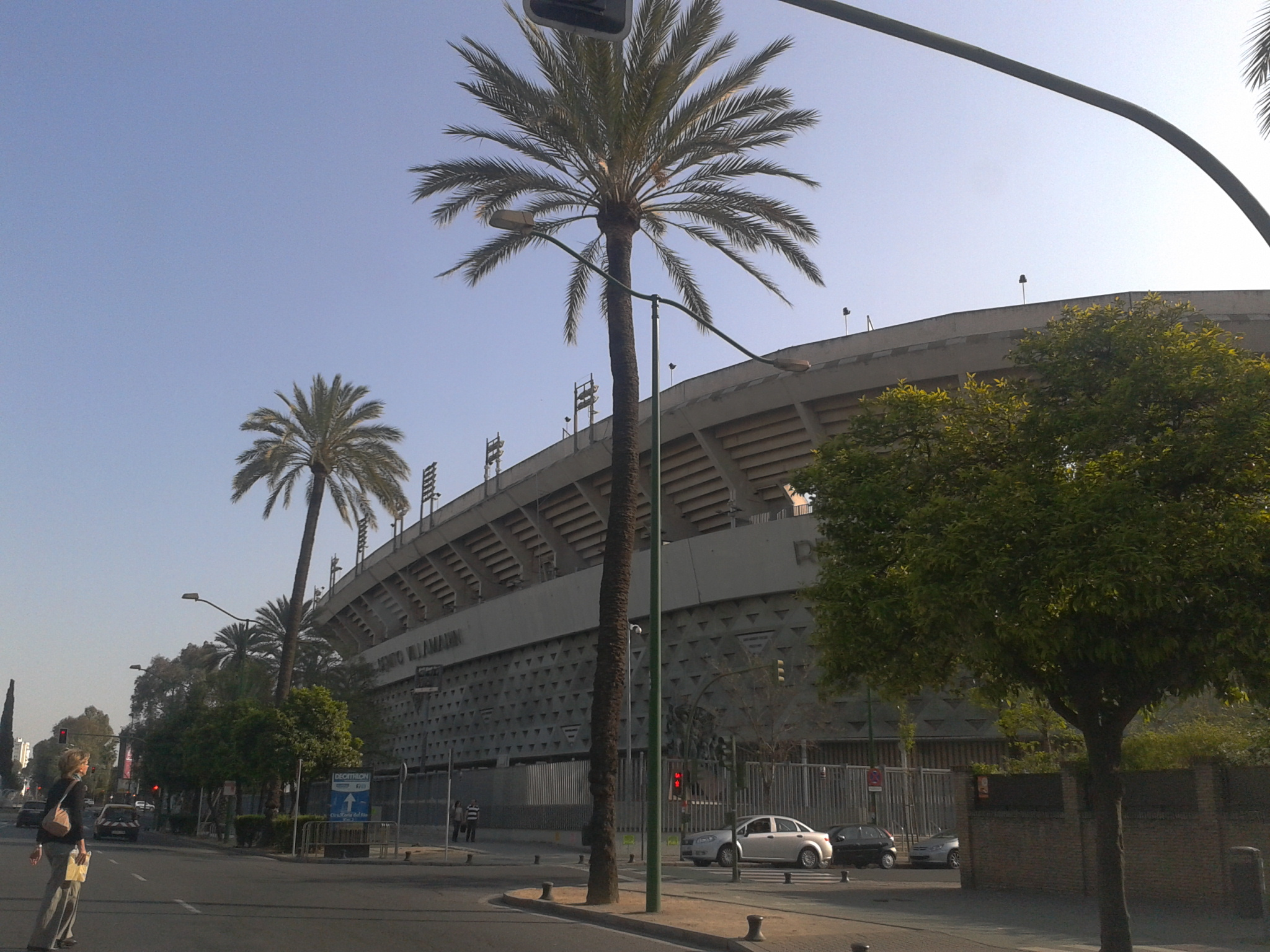
Exterior of the stadium in 2014

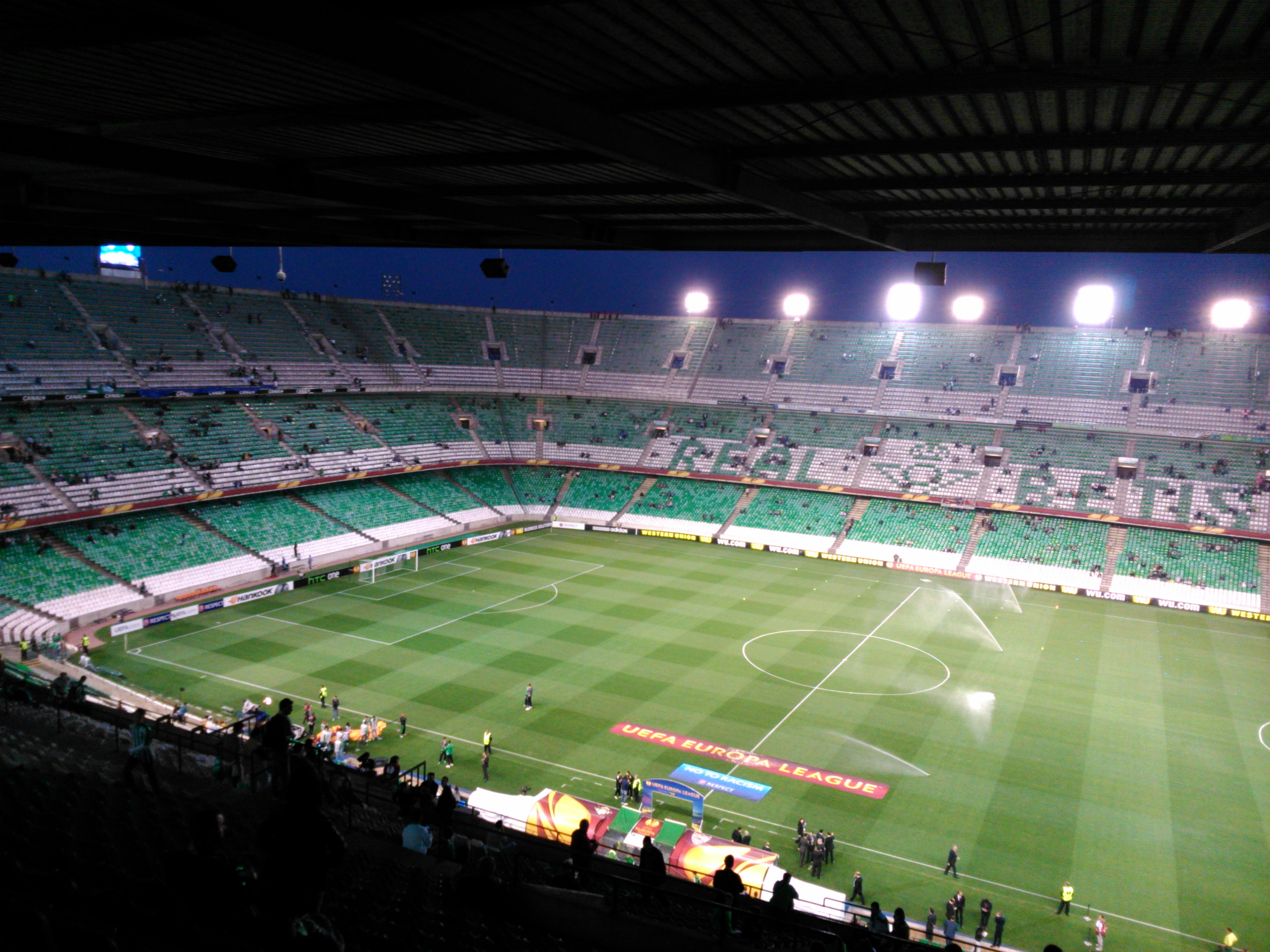
Interior of the stadium in 2014

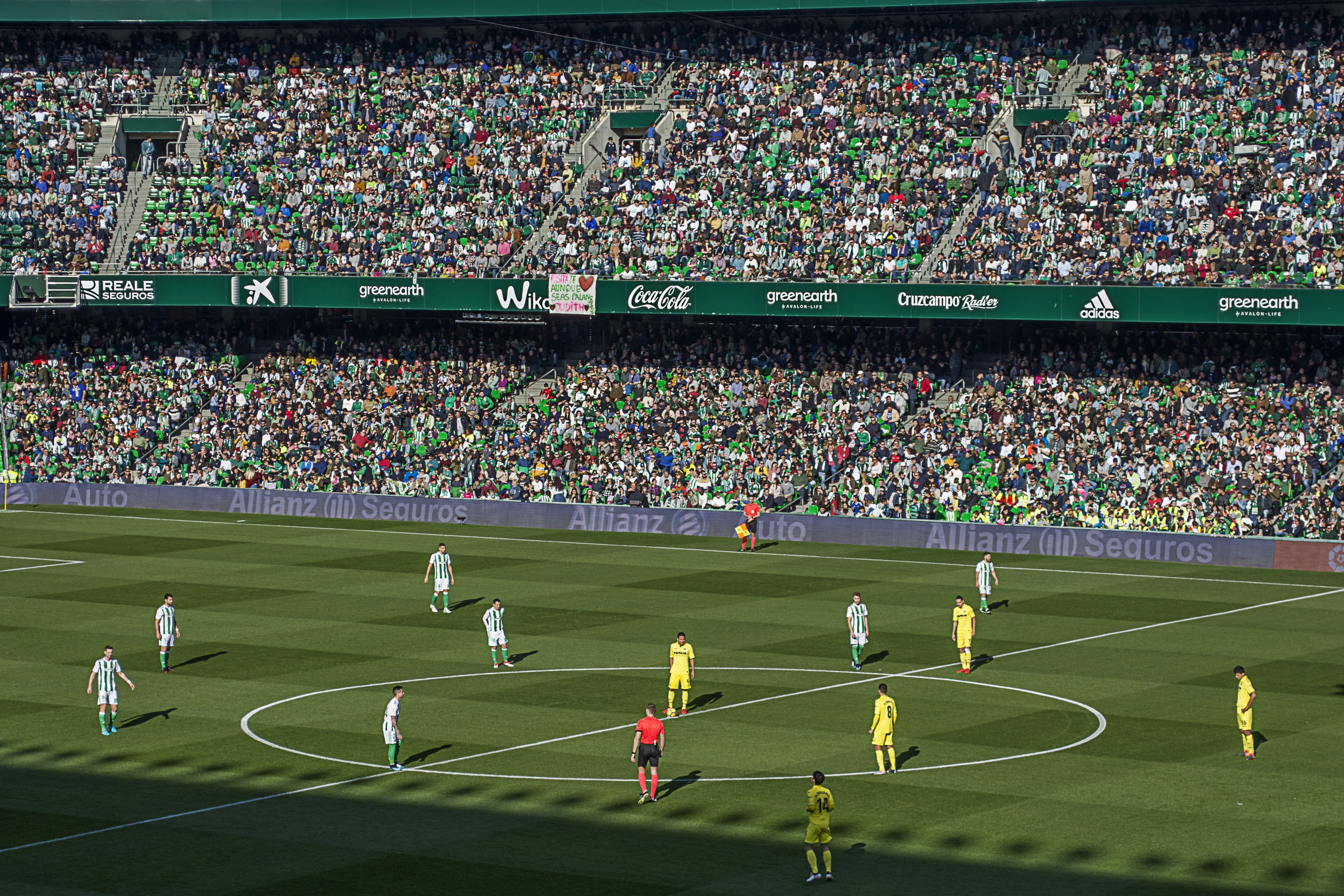
Real Betis vs Villarreal in 2018

== See also ==
- List of stadiums in Spain
- Lists of stadiums
