= Museum of Arts and Popular Customs of Seville =

Museum in Seville, Andalusia, Spain

Coordinates: 37.3719°N 5.98778°W

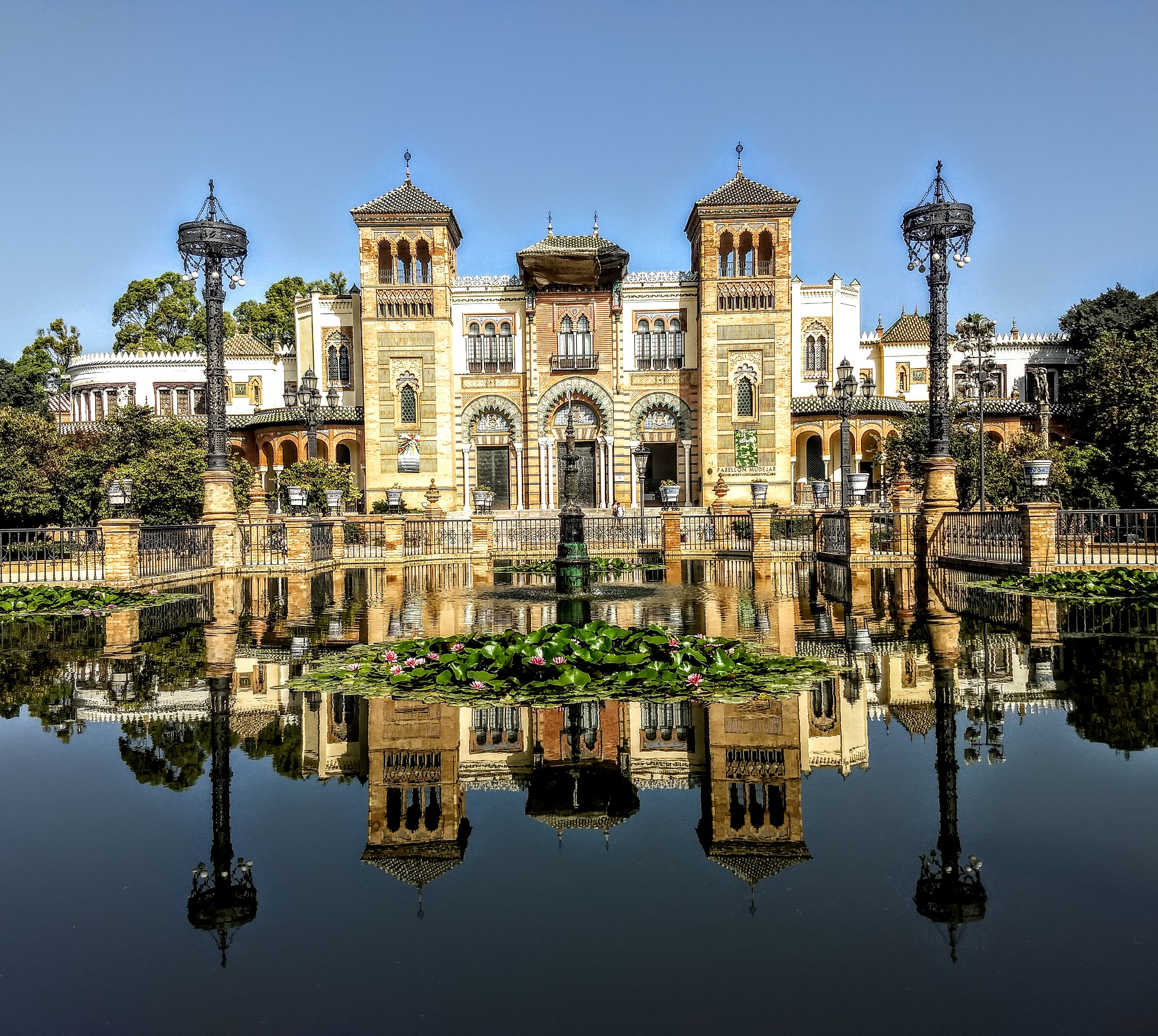
Mudéjar Pavilion, Museum of Arts and Popular Customs of Seville

The Museum of Arts and Popular Customs of Seville (Spanish: Museo de Artes y Costumbres Populares) is a museum in Seville, Andalusia, Spain, located in the María Luisa Park, across the Plaza de América from the Provincial Archeological Museum. The museum had 84,496 visitors in 2007.

== History ==
The museum occupies the Mudéjar Pavilion (Pabellón Mudéjar) designed by Aníbal González and built in 1914. It served as an art pavilion, the Pabellón de Arte Antiguo, for the Ibero-American Exposition of 1929, when Aníbal González had the opportunity to design several additional permanent buildings for the plaza. The exterior is ceramic over brick, and has three doors with archivolts adorned with glazed tiles (azulejos).

The building originally consisted of two stories over an aeration chamber (necessary because of the humidity). In the 1960s, the main floor, originally over 12 metres (39 ft) high, was divided in two, with an intermediate level added by architect Delgado Roig. In 1972, as part of the preparations for the current museum, the various stories of the building were connected by a grand spiral staircase designed by José Galnares Sagastizábal.

The museum was established by a decree of 23 March 1972, initially as a section of the Museum of Fine Arts of Seville. It opened its doors to the public 4 March 1973. For the next seven years, the museum fell under the responsibility of the Ministry of Education and Science, but the city government occupied more than half of the poorly maintained building. Neither institution took full responsibility. This situation led to a series of temporary closures. In 1976, the electric bill could not be paid, and the museum had to be shut until it could get power again. In 1979, heavy rains damaged the interior.

On 26 March 1980, the City Council agreed to allow the Ministry of Education and Science to use the whole building, for as long as it was used for the museum, on the condition that the Ministry would suitably restore it. On this basis, the Ministry hired architect Fernando Villanueva Sandino. The resulting restoration converted the primitive aeration chamber into a new lower-ground floor. The museum reopened 18 October 1984; at that same time the new Andalusian Autonomous Government took over the museum, along with other museums in Andalusia that had been operated by the central government of Spain.

In 1990 the main floor was further fitted out for temporary exhibitions, and in 1994 the Díaz Velázquez Collection was permanently installed, with a little over a third of the building remaining for temporary exhibitions.

== Facilities and layout ==
The public portion of the museum occupies the lower-ground floor, the main floor, and the additional floor (now "first floor") that was created by Delgado Roig. The permanent exhibition space amounts to 5,496 square metres (59,160 sq ft). The upper floor contains the museum library (specialized in ethnography and museology). There is also a photo archive, audiovisual and conference rooms, as well as a restoration studio and a photography laboratory. Temporary exhibitions can be visited independently of visiting the rest of the museum.

As of 2010, the arrangement of exhibits is:

- Main floor
  - Halls I–II: Díaz Velázquez collections of embroidery and lace.
  - Halls III–V: Temporary exhibitions
  - Halls VI–VII: Recreation of the Díaz Velázquez family dwelling
- First floor
  - Halls I–II: Apparel, personal adornment, and religious objects
  - Hall III: Musical instruments and popular literature
  - Hall IV: Cultivation of wheat
  - Halls V–VI: Goldsmithing and embroidery
  - Hall VII: Fittings and furniture
- Lower-ground floor
  - Hall I: Functions of domestic furniture (mobilario)
  - Hall II: Functions of domestic furniture (ajuar)
  - Hall III: Types of domestic containers
  - Hall IV: Traditional offices
  - Hall V: Ceramics and tilemaking
  - Hall VI: Ceramics workshops. Popular use of ceramics
  - Hall VII: Winemaking
  - Hall VIII: La Cartuja (?) and Japanese ceramics
  - Hall IX: Knives and firearms
  - Hall X: Metalwork
  - Hall XI–XII: Various techniques of processing
  - This floor also includes storage areas, archives, audiovisual space, and the restoration studio.

== Collections ==
Most of the items in the museum date back to its original collection. The museum was founded as a section of the Museum of Fine Arts, and the largest and most significant portion of the collection came from that museum. Particularly notable are the Aguiar collection of costumbrista paintings; the Soria collection of Oriental porcelain and ivory; and some pieces from the Orleans and Gestoso collections. Other pieces have been donated by other museums, such as a collection of Sevillian azulejos (glazed tiles) donated by the Archeological Museum of Seville, and other donations from the Museo del Pueblo Español (Madrid), the Museum of Fine Arts Valencia, and from various smaller museums in Andalusia. Various people of Seville have also made important donations, filling gaps in the collections; for example, they have donated textiles, agricultural tools, household utensils, and musical instruments. Other pieces were purchased in the 1970s, when the museum came under the aegis of the Ministry of Education and Science. The largest donation after the founding was the 1979 Díaz Velázquez legacy, one of Europe's best collections of embroidery and lace, with nearly 6,000 pieces. Acquisitions since 2000 include the Loty collection of more than 2,000 glass panels depicting details Andalusian cities and life from roughly 1900 to 1936, and the 168-piece Allepuz ethnographic collection.

The collection of Andalusian popular ceramics has developed over time, and is rivaled only be the collection at the Museum of Ethnology, Hamburg. The city donated the originals of the posters for the annual Seville Fair (Feria de Abril). The Department of Culture supplemented this with the Mencos collection in the museum, the most complete known collection of lithographs and color photographs of Feria and Semana Santa (Holy Week in Seville) posters.

Other acquisitions were the outgrowth of fieldwork: the research of Carmen Ortiz led to the donation of the cooperage workshop of Claudio Bernal, the city's last cooper; Andrés Carretero's work similarly led to the donation of the workshop of guitarmaker Francisco Barba; Esther Fernández work added a gilding workshop; other workshops donated included those of Filigrana, master maker of castanets, and of goldsmith Fernando Marmolejo. Marmolejo was the last in a four-centuries-old family profession, and some of his tools dated back centuries. The museum now has eight workshops on exhibit.

== Use as a film set ==
The building has been used several times as a set for films or television shows, including the 1974 American film The Wind and the Lion and the 1985 French Film Harem, where it was used as the British Embassy.
