= Treasure of El Carambolo =

Treasure hoard

Coordinates: 37°23′34.57″N 6°2′13.62″W

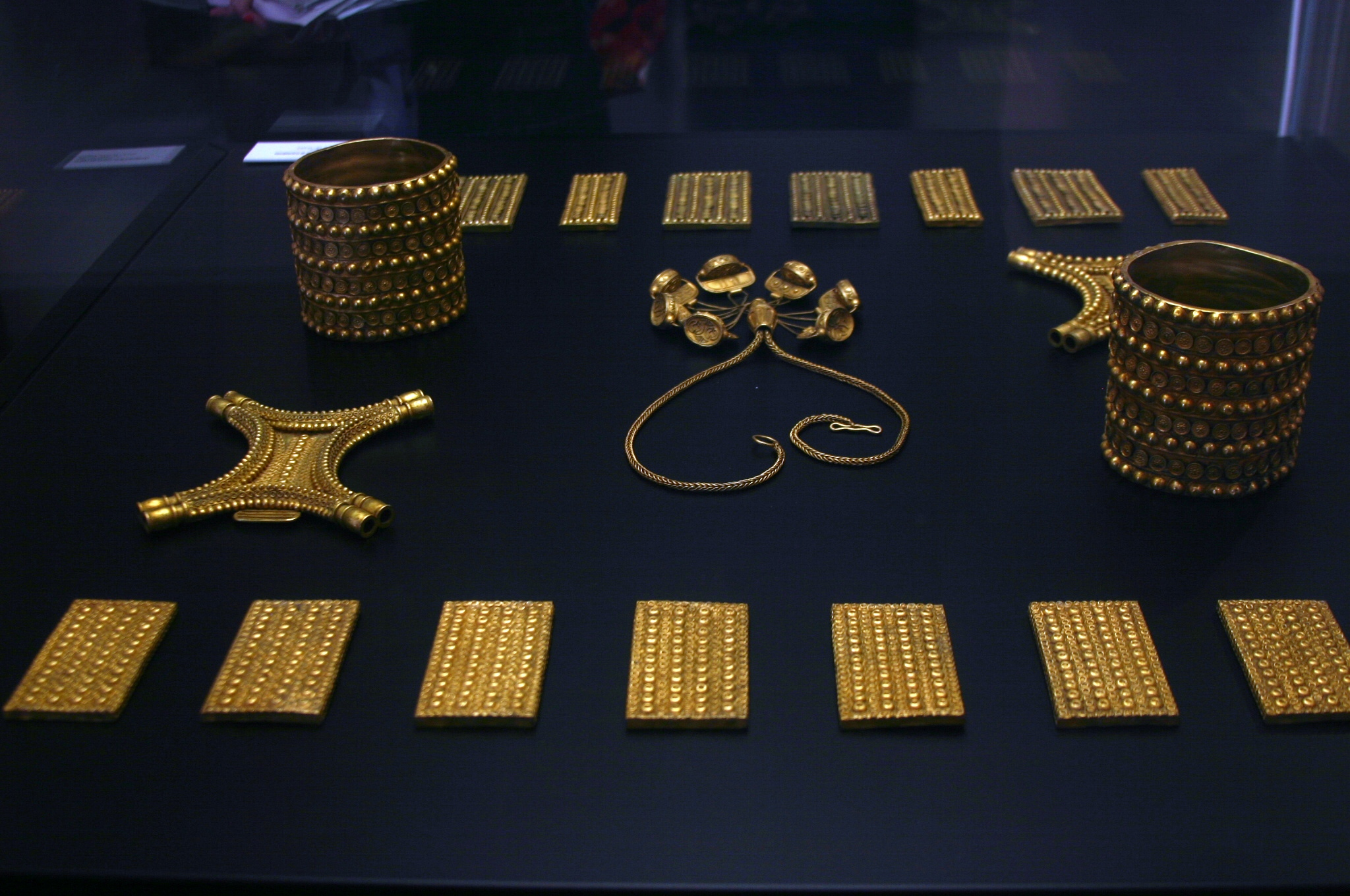
The original treasure

The Treasure of El Carambolo (Spanish: Tesoro del Carambolo) was found in El Carambolo hill in the municipality of Camas (Province of Seville, Andalusia, Spain), 3 kilometers west of Seville, on 30 September 1958. The discovery of the treasure hoard spurred interest in the Tartessos culture, which prospered from the 9th to the 6th centuries BCE, but recent scholars have debated whether the treasure was a product of local culture or of the Phoenicians. The treasure was found by Spanish construction workers during renovations being made at a pigeon shooting society.

After years of displaying a replica while the original treasure was locked in a safe, the Archeological Museum of Seville has put the original artifacts on permanent display since January 2012. A replica is on display in the National Archaeological Museum in Madrid.

== Gold treasure ==
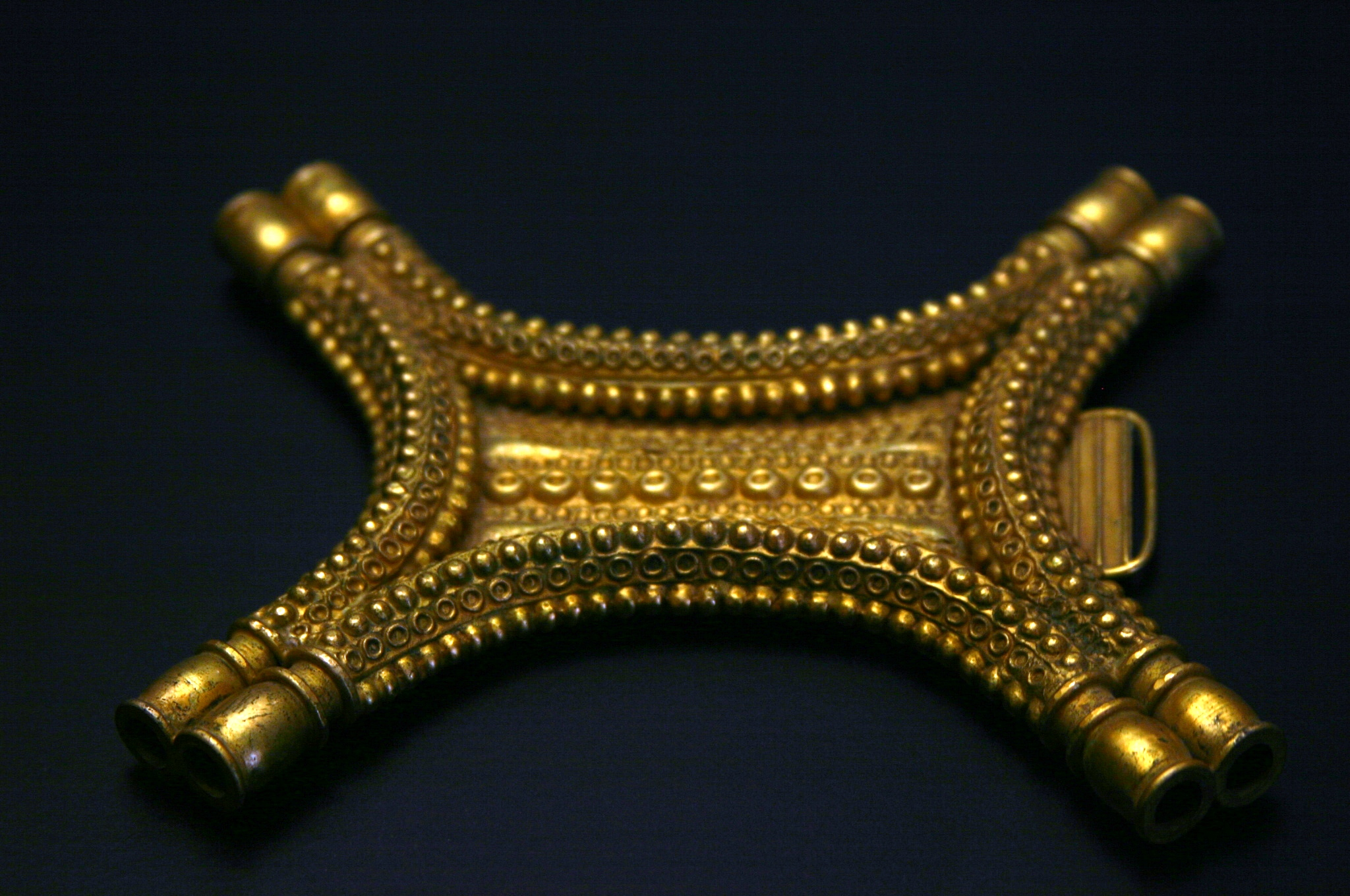
One of the pectorals

It consists of 21 pieces of crafted gold: a necklace with pendants, two bracelets, two ox-hide-shaped pectorals, and 16 plaques. The jewelry had been buried inside a ceramic vessel. The plaques may have made up a necklace or diadem; alternatively, some current thinking is that they were attached to textiles adorning animals led to sacrifice, while the necklace and bracelets were worn by the priest officiating. Following the discovery, archaeologist Juan de Mata Carriazo excavated the site. The treasure has been dated to the 8th century BCE, with the exception of the necklace, which is thought to be from 6th century BCE Cyprus. The hoard itself is thought to have been deliberately buried in the 6th century BCE.

Two distinct archaeological sites have been found at El Carambolo with the later replacing the first. One, on top of a hill, referred to as "Carambolo Alto" dates from the ninth to mid-eighth century BCE. Remains at this site consist mainly of burned huts and pottery with geometric designs. The first site reflects indigenous culture and is dated before the arrival of the Phoenicians. The second site, on the side of the hill facing the river, is known as "Carambolo Bajo." This site dates from the beginning of trade with the Phoenicians in the mid-eighth century. The Treasure of El Carambolo is associated with the second site, and may have been buried at the time of the site's destruction in the sixth century. The discovery of a statue of the Phoenician goddess Astarte cast doubt on the interpretation of the site as an indigenous settlement and led some to argue that it was more Phoenician than Tartessian. Further excavations at the site revealed a Phoenician religious sanctuary.

== Phoenician statuette ==
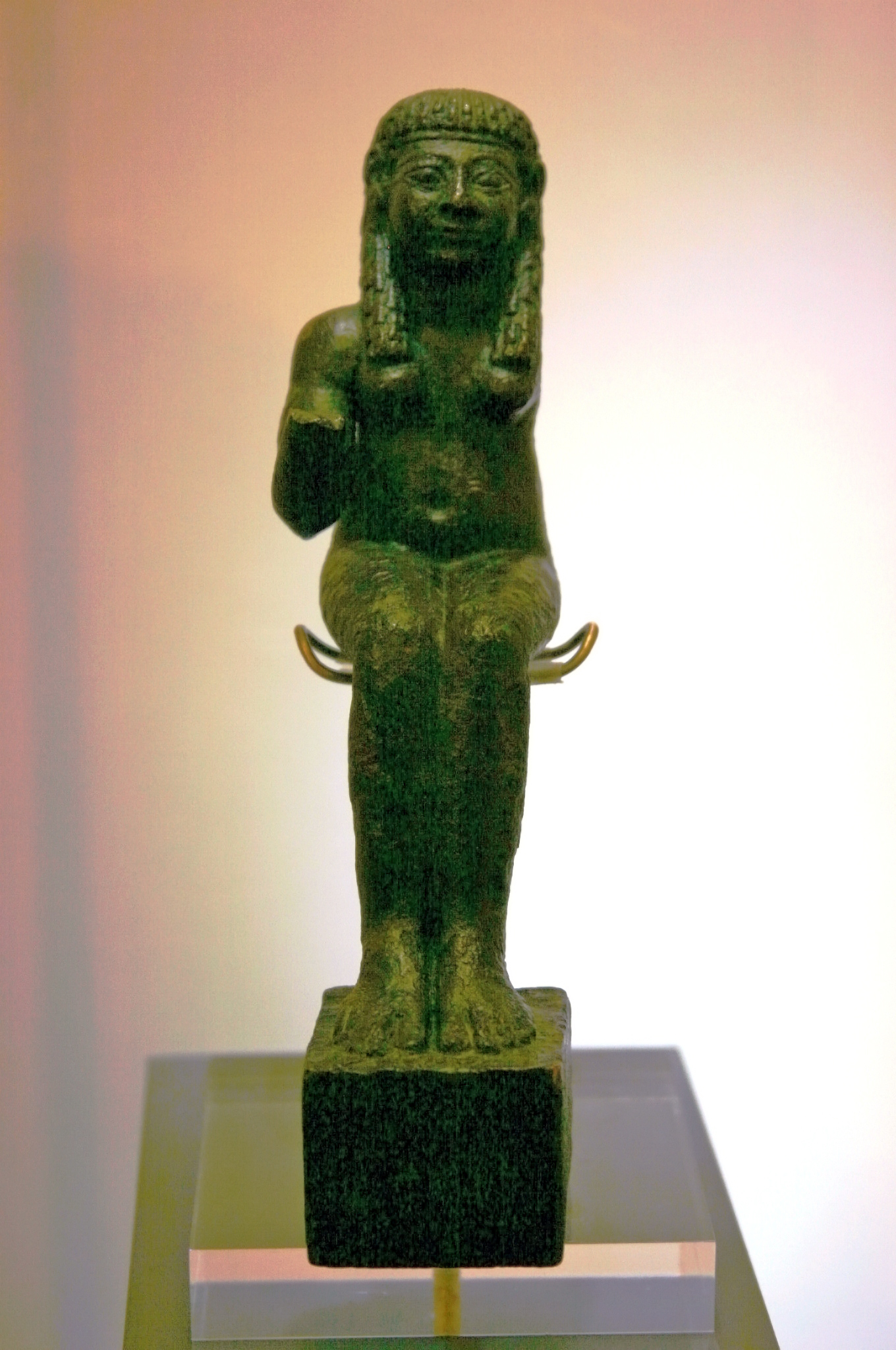
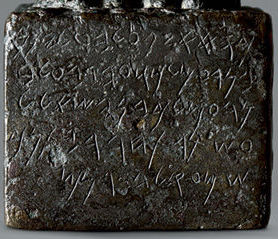
7th cent. BCE Phoenician statuette of Astarte in the Archeological Museum of Seville

Between 1960 and 1962, a small bronze statuette of Astarte was found in El Carambolo. The plinth (4.1 x 2.8 cm) contained a notable Phoenician inscription, known today as KAI 294, with five lines of Phoenician text. It was delivered to the Archeological Museum of Seville by Joaquín Romero Murube in 1963.

== Provenance ==
A 2018 study used chemical and isotopic analysis to try and resolve this debate over the hoard's provenance. The study concluded that while the jewelry was crafted using predominantly Phoenician techniques, the gold itself was sourced from mines only 20 kilometres (12 mi) away, likely the same mines which provided gold for the massive underground tombs at Valencina de la Concepcion.
