= Archeological Museum of Seville =

- Museo Arqueológico de Sevilla
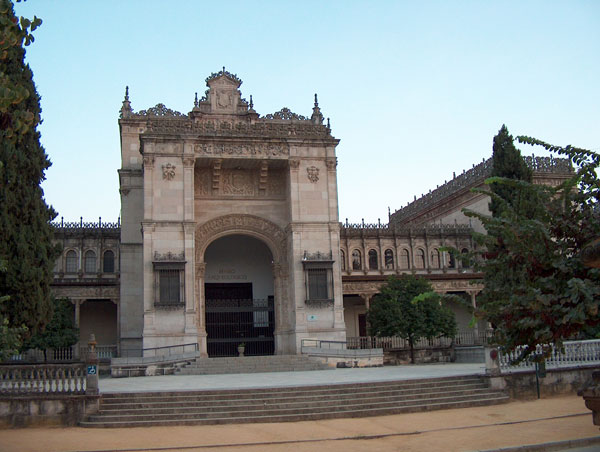
- Established: 1879
- Location: Seville, Spain
- Coordinates: 37°22′15″N 5°59′14″W
- Type: Archaeology museum
- Architect: Aníbal González
- Owner: General State Administration

The Archeological Museum of Seville (Spanish: Museo Arqueológico de Sevilla) is a museum in Seville, southern Spain, housed in the Pabellón del Renacimiento, one of the pavilions designed by the architect Aníbal González. These pavilions at the Plaza de España were created for the Ibero-American Exposition of 1929.

== History ==
The institution was created via royal order issued on 21 November 1879.

Following a move of the collection to the Pabellón del Renacimiento started in 1942, 8 exhibition rooms were opened in the new premises on 25 May 1946.

== Collection ==
The museum's basement houses the El Carambolo treasure, discovered in Camas (3 km NW of Seville) in 1958. The treasure comprises 2950 grams of 24-carat gold and consists of golden bracelets, a golden chain with pendant, buckles, belt- and forehead plates. The hoard, initially associated to Tartessos, has been however interpreted since the 1990s rather as part of a Phoenician sanctuary; this later hypothesis was verified by new archaeological digs in the 2000s. The treasure includes a small figurine of Astarte, a Phoenician goddess.

Other halls of the museum contain findings from the Roman era, many of which are from the nearby Roman city of Itálica. The Itálica exhibits include mosaics, statues (including the famous Venus of Itálica), and busts of the emperors Augustus, Vespasianus, Trajan and Hadrian. Another of the iconic sculptural items of the collection is the Seated Marriage of Orippo, donated by the Marquise of Esquivel in 1944.

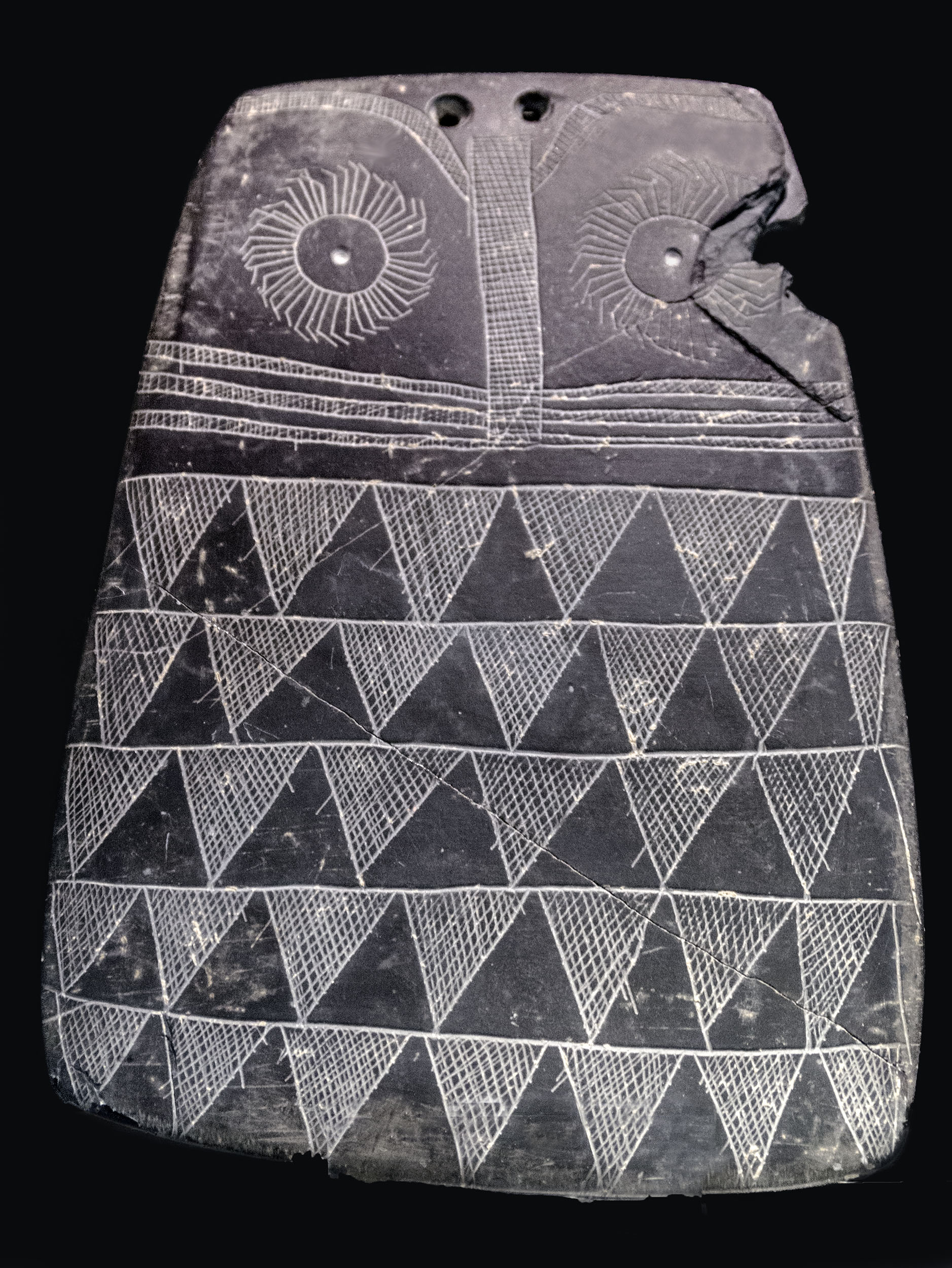
Valencina idol-plaque (3000–2100 BC)

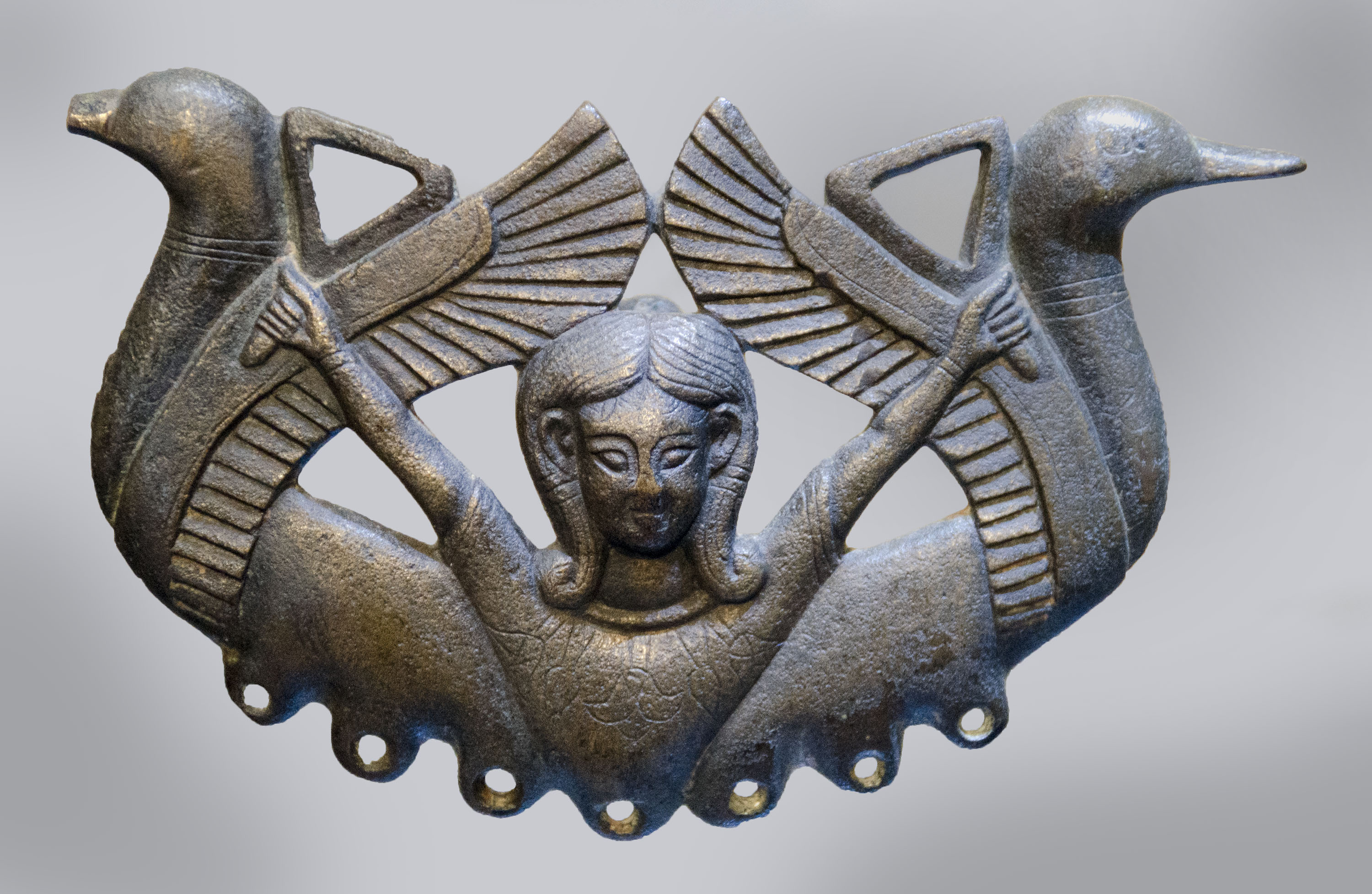
The so-called "Bronze Carriazo"

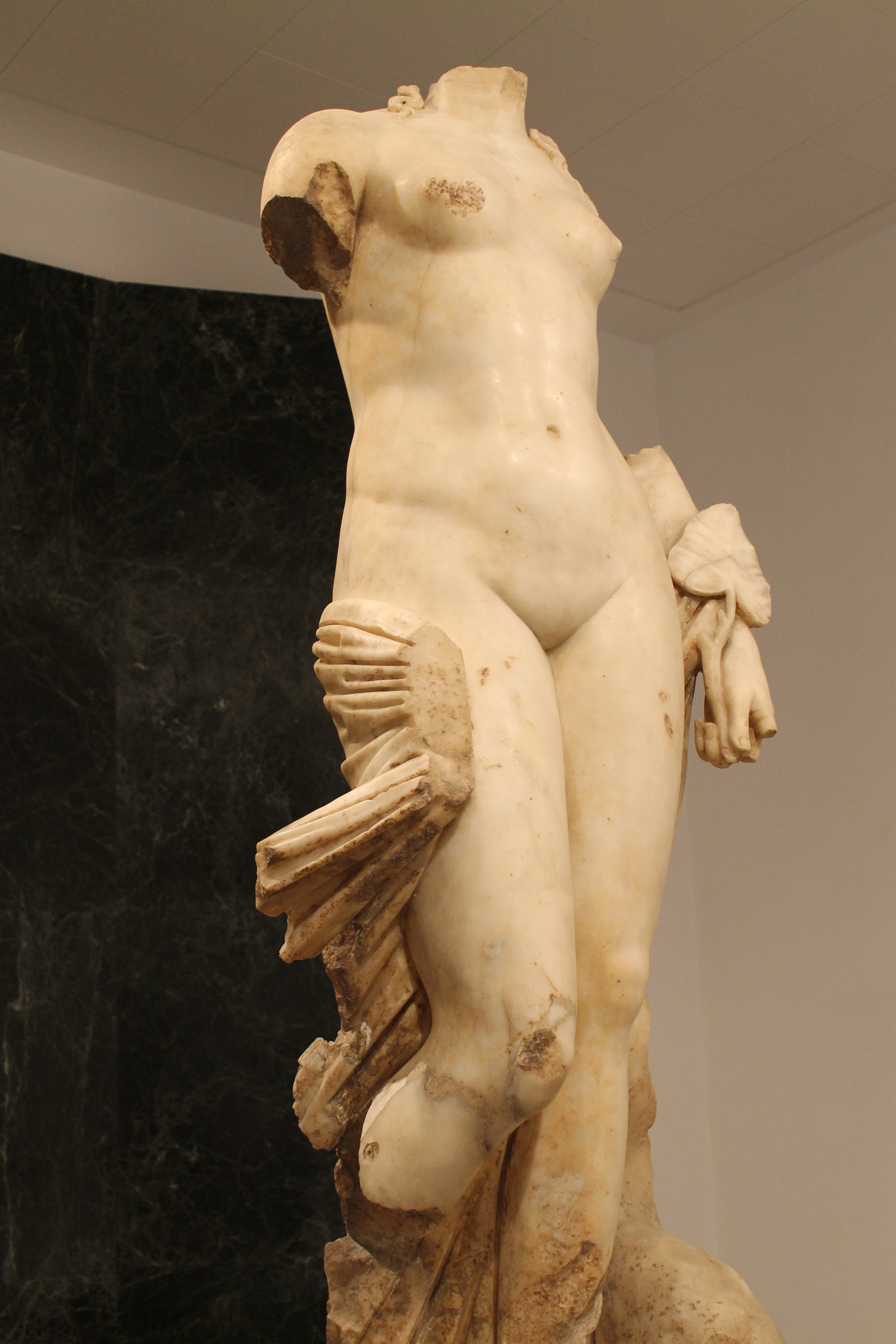
Venus from Italica (117 AD)
