= Plaza de España, Seville =

Coordinates: 37°22′37″N 5°59′13″W

Plaza de España
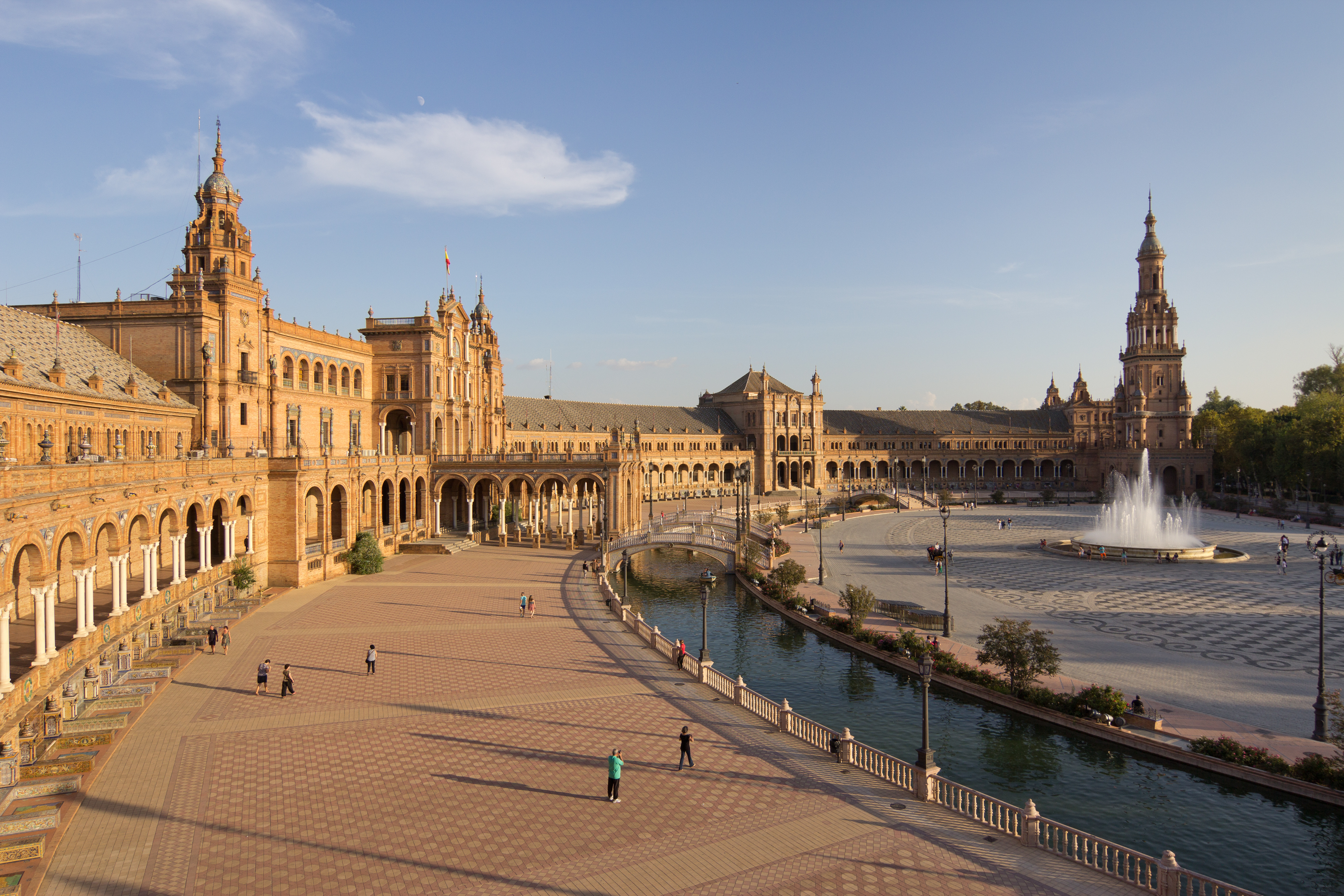
- Building at the Plaza at sunset

General information
- Architectural style: Spanish Regionalism, mixing Spanish Renaissance Revival, Spanish Baroque Revival and Neo-Mudéjar styles
- Location: Seville, Spain
- Completed: 1928
- Client: Alfonso XIII

Technical details
- Floor area: 45,932 m^{2} (494,410 sq ft)

Design and construction
- Architect: Aníbal González

The Plaza de España ("Spain Square", in English) is a plaza in Maria Luisa Park in Seville, Spain. It was built in 1928 for the Ibero-American Exposition of 1929. It is a landmark example of Regionalism Architecture, mixing elements of the Baroque Revival, Renaissance Revival and Moorish Revival (Neo-Mudéjar) styles of Spanish architecture.

== History ==
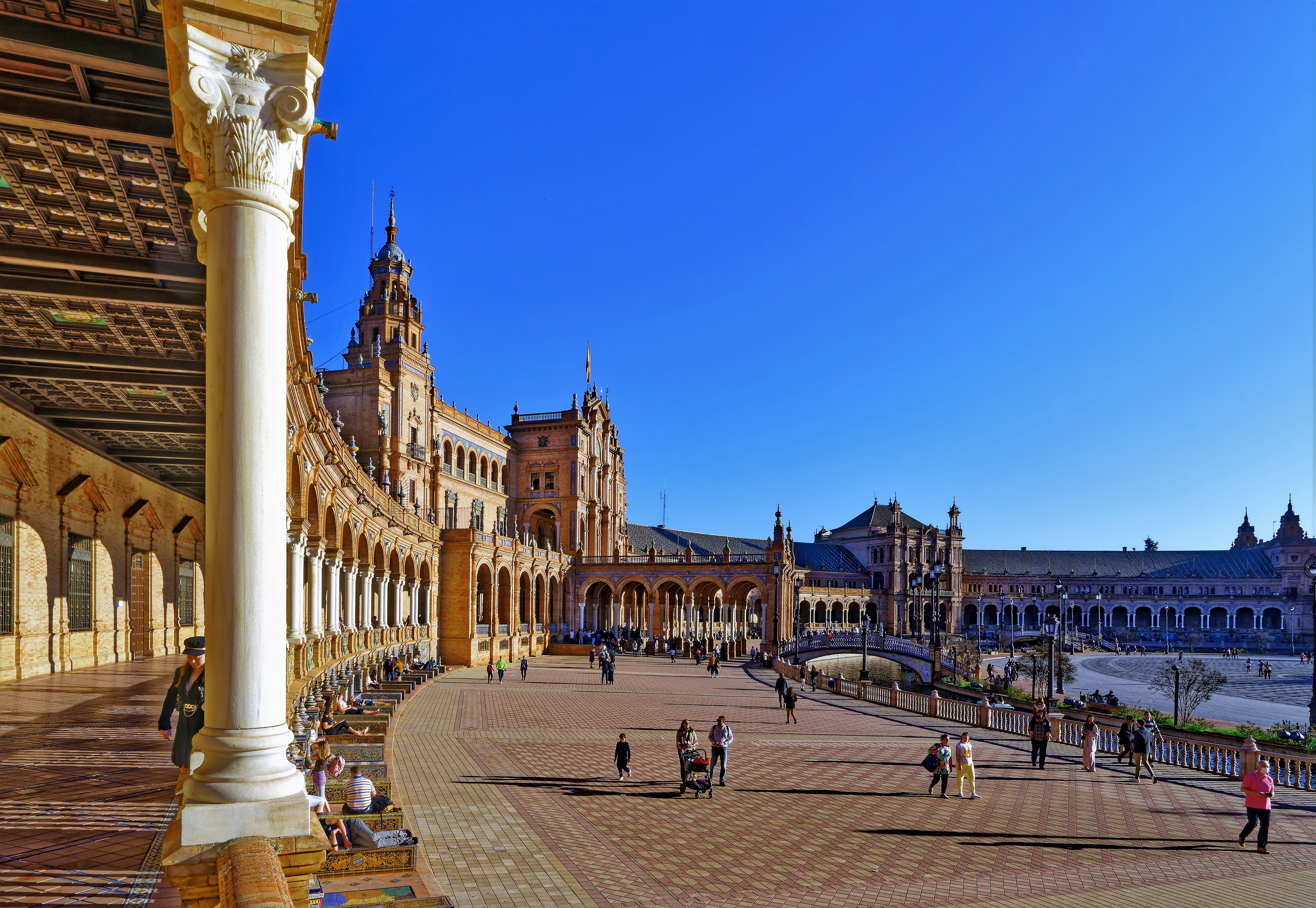

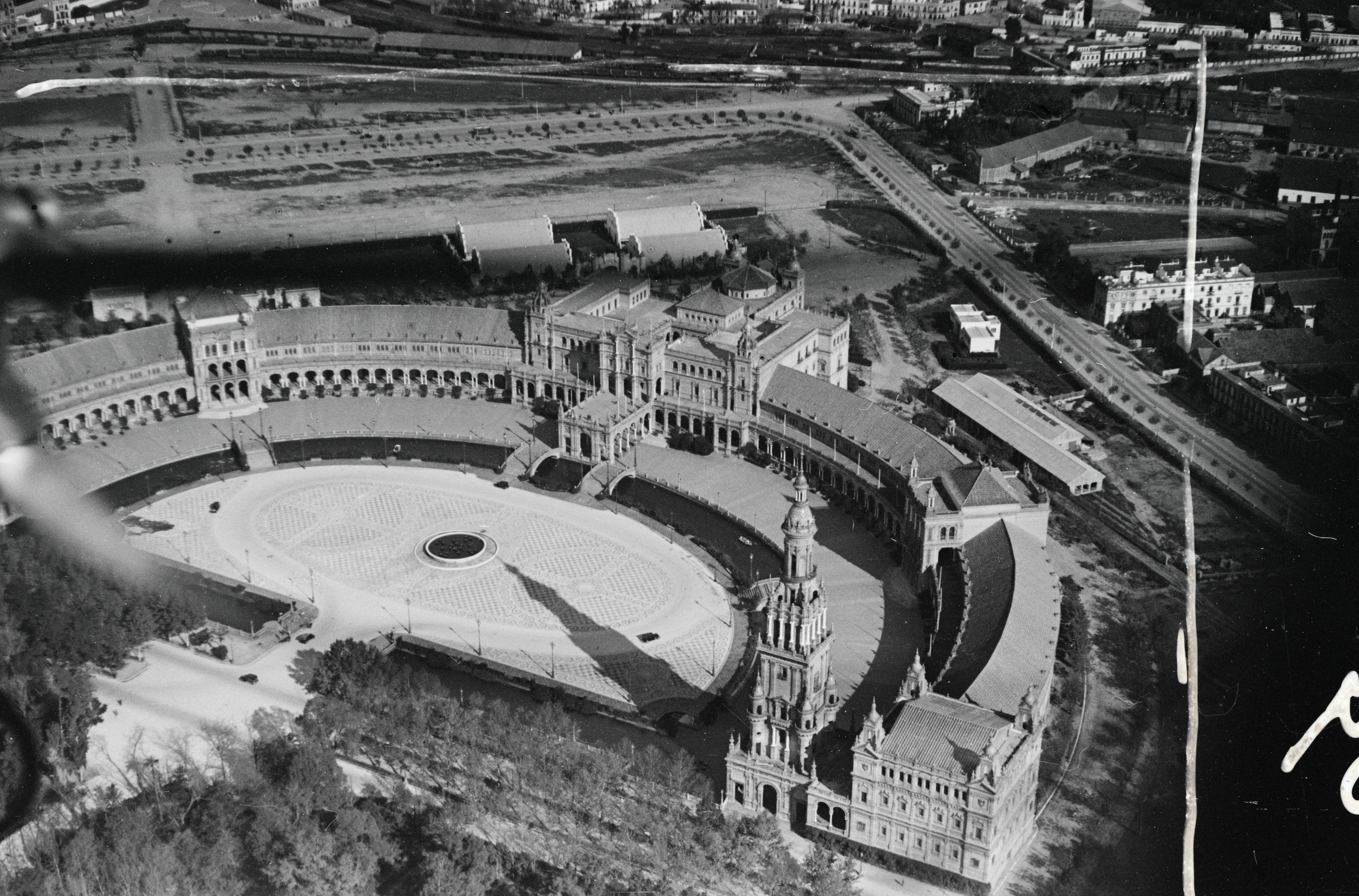
Aerial view from 1932 by Walter Mittelholzer, ETH-Bibliothek.

=== Maria Luisa Park ===
In 1929, Seville hosted the Ibero-American Exposition World's Fair, located in the celebrated Maria Luisa Park (Parque de María Luisa). The park gardens were designed by Jean-Claude Nicolas Forestier. The entire southern end of the city was redeveloped into an expanse of gardens and grand boulevards.

The centre of it is Parque de María Luisa, designed in a "Moorish paradisical style", with a half mile of tiled fountains, pavilions, walls, ponds, benches, and exhedras; lush plantings of palms, orange trees, Mediterranean pines, and stylized flower beds. Numerous buildings were constructed in the park to provide spaces for the exhibition.

=== Plaza de España ===
The Plaza de España, designed by Aníbal González, was a principal building built on the Maria Luisa Park's edge to showcase Spain's industry and technology exhibits. González combined a mix of 1920s Art Deco and Spanish Renaissance Revival, Spanish Baroque Revival and Neo-Mudéjar styles. The Plaza de España complex is a huge half-circle; the buildings are accessible by four bridges over the moat, which represent the ancient kingdoms of Spain. In the centre is the Vicente Traver fountain.

Many tiled alcoves were built around the plaza, each representing a different province of Spain. The Plaza's tiled Alcoves of the Provinces are frequent backdrops for visitors' portrait photographs, taken in their own home province. Each alcove is flanked by a pair of covered bookshelves, now used by visitors in the manner of a "Little Free Library". Each bookshelf often contains works with information about their province. Visitors have also donated favorite novels and other books for others to read.

Today the buildings of the Plaza de España have been renovated and adapted for use as offices for government agencies. The central government departments, with sensitive adaptive redesign, are located within it. Toward the end of the park, the grandest mansions from the fair have been adapted as museums. The most distant museum contains the city's archaeology collections. The main exhibits are Roman mosaics and artefacts from nearby Italica.

The Plaza de España has been used as a filming location, including scenes for Lawrence of Arabia (1962). The building was used as a location in the Star Wars movie series Star Wars: Episode II – Attack of the Clones (2002) — in which it featured in exterior shots of the City of Theed on the Planet Naboo. It also featured in the 2012 film The Dictator. The 2023 Netflix series, Kaos, also featured scenes filmed at the Plaza.

The plaza was used as a set for the video of Simply Red's song "Something Got Me Started".

=== Restoration ===
From 2007 to 2010, the Seville City Council invested 9 million euros in the restoration of the Plaza de España. The objective was to recover the original monument as the architect, Aníbal González, conceived it. To restore it, the restoration team worked to recover pieces such as the ceramic streetlights, benches, and even pavements. In other cases, they created reproductions of elements based on photographs and postcards from the municipal newspaper library. Cefoarte and Diaz Cubero were some of the experts who worked in multidisciplinary teams to restore this complex to lively use.

Current Photos
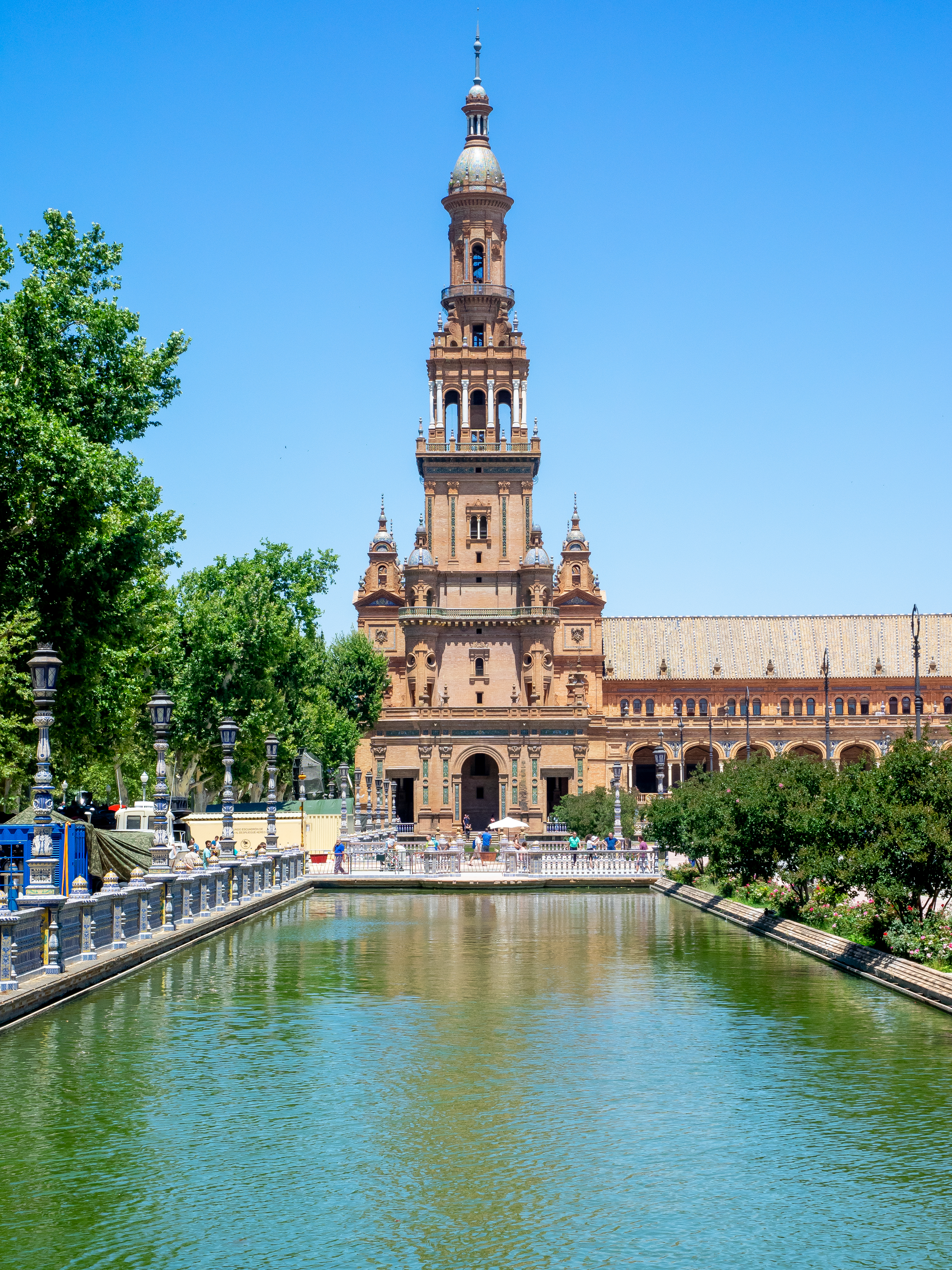
North tower and river

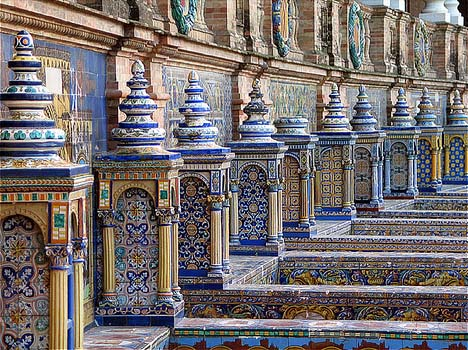
The tiled Provincial Alcoves along the walls of the Plaza de España

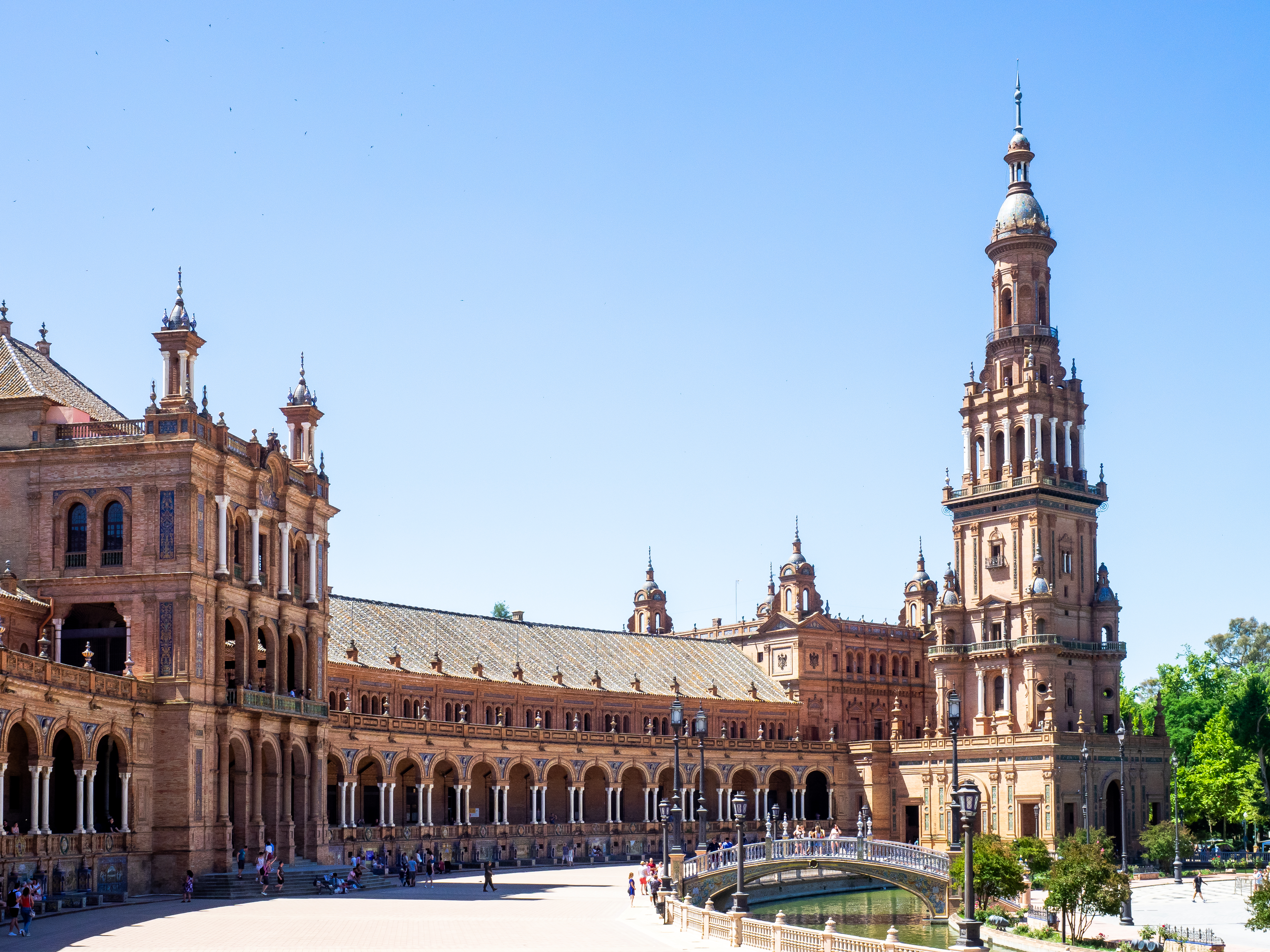
South Wing of the Plaza

== Panoramics ==
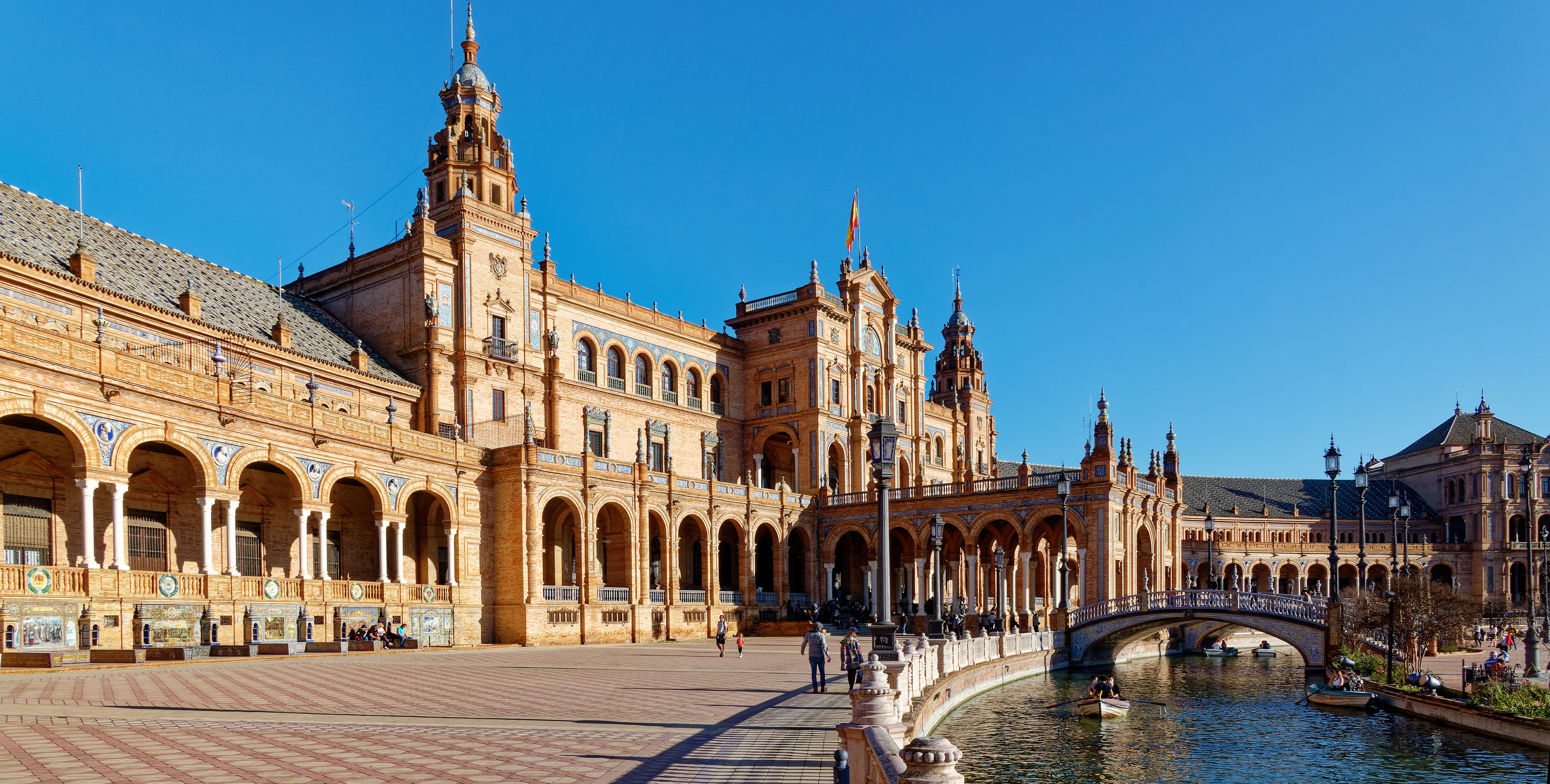
View of Plaza de España.
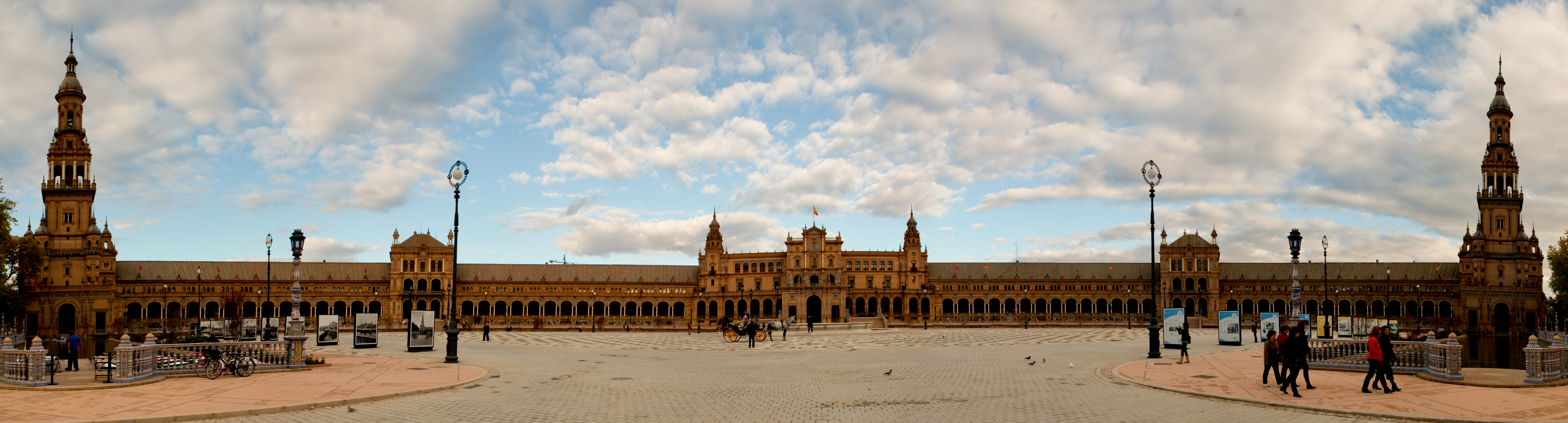
The pavilion buildings within the Plaza de España.
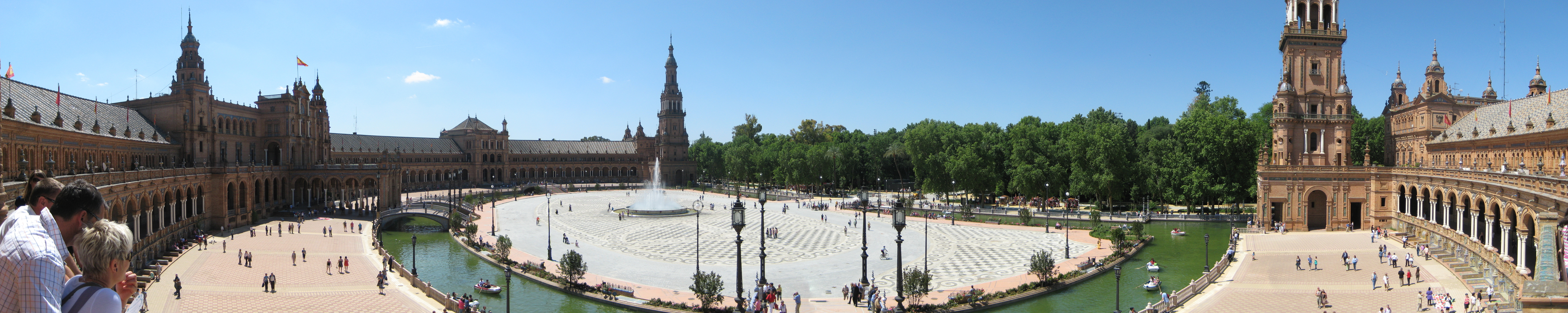
Views across the Plaza de España.
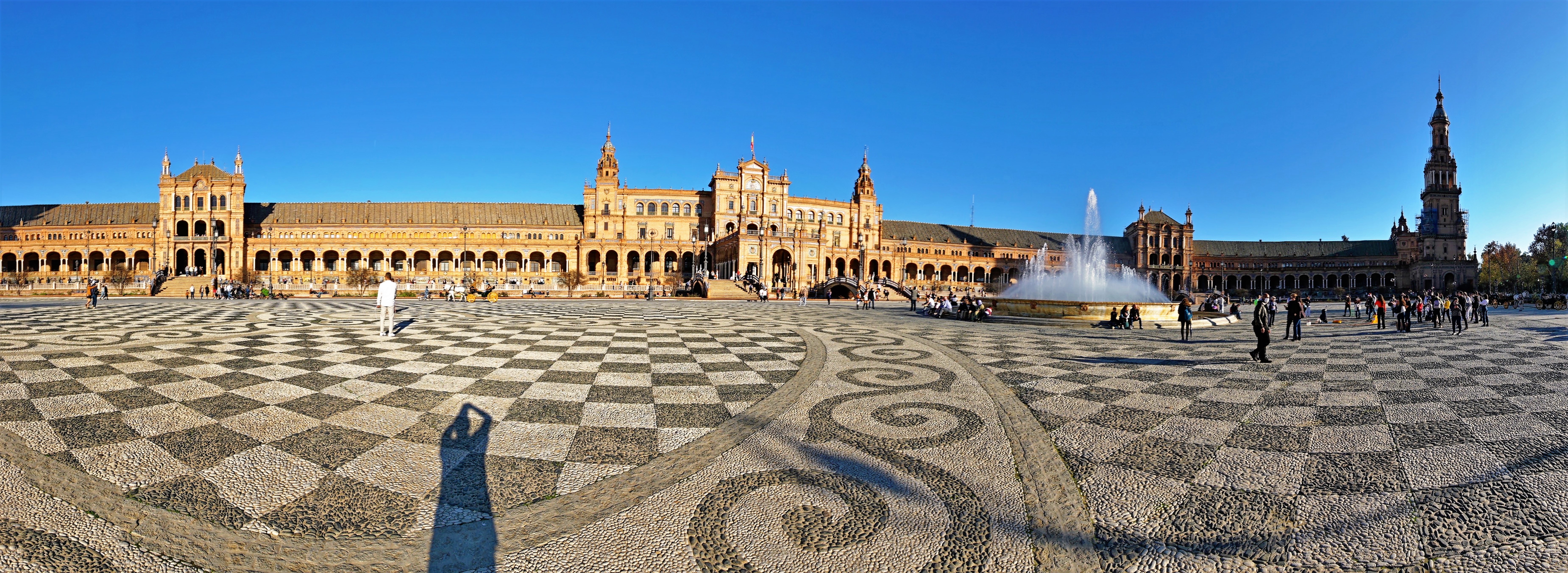
Plaza de España at dawn

== See also ==
- Ibero-American Exposition of 1929
- Spanish gardens
- Paradise garden
- Persian gardens
- History of gardening
