= Aníbal González Álvarez-Ossorio =

Spanish architect (1876–1929)

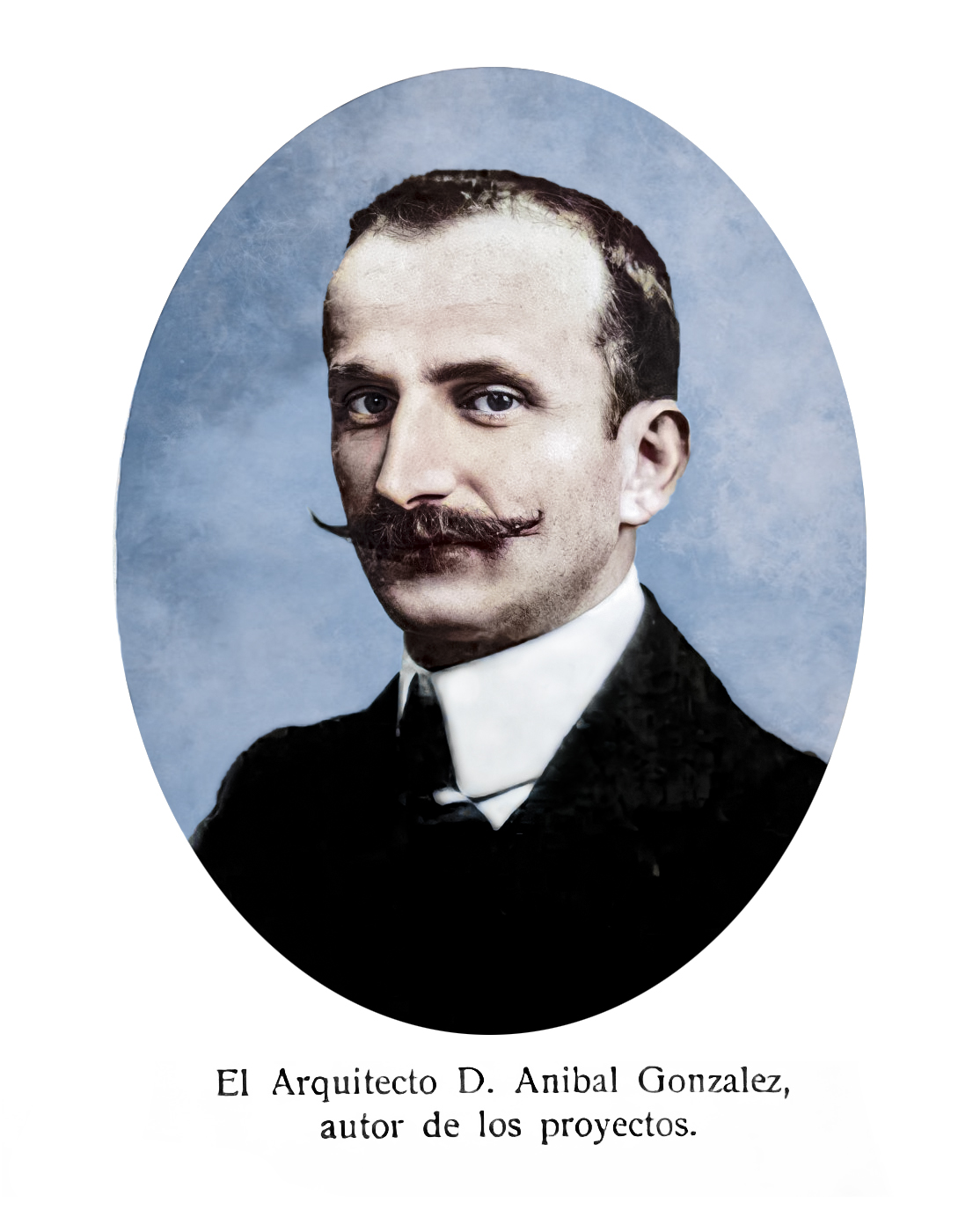
- Born: 10 June 1876; Seville, Spain
- Died: 31 May 1929 (aged 52); Seville, Spain
- Occupation: Architect
- Buildings: Plaza de España, Museum of Arts and Traditions of Sevilla, Archeological Museum of Seville

Aníbal González Álvarez-Ossorio (10 June 1876 in Seville – 31 May 1929 also in Seville) was a Spanish architect who made important buildings in Seville and Madrid. At the beginning of his career his style was Art Deco, but later evolved towards regionalism. He designed the Plaza de España and he was the chief architect of the Ibero-American Exposition of 1929 in Seville.

== Biography ==
González was born in Seville to José González Espejo and Catalina Álvarez-Ossorio y Pizarro. He studied in La Escuela Superior de Arquitectura (Madrid Superior Technical School of Architecture) where he graduated in 1902. Other architects in his class included Joaquín Rojí, Tomás Acha, Luchas Alday, Amós Salvador, Miguel G. de la Any, Jerónimo P. Mathet, Juan J. Gorruchaga, Luis López, Calixto Sancho, Demetrio Ribes, Francisco García Navas and Gregorio Rábago. Two of his teachers were Ricardo Velázquez Bosco, an exponent of the Second Empire architectural style and one of the main eclecticist architects of Spain in the first third of the 20th century, and Vicente Lamperez, a prominent restorer, architect and art historian and member of the Royal Academy of History.

== Ibero-American Exposition of 1929 ==
Aníbal González was appointed chief architect of the Sevilla Iberoamerican Exposition of 1929, where he worked until 1926. He designed in the Plaza de América of Maria Luisa Park, the Mudéjar Pavilion that was accomplished in 1914 (currently Museum of Arts and Traditions of Sevilla), the Palacio del Renacimiento (currently Archeological Museum of Seville) and the Real Pavilion. His most famous work for the Exposition is the Plaza de España, completed in 1929 that was the most emblematic place of this event. González combined a mix of 1920s Art Deco and 'mock Mudejar', and Neo-Mudéjar styles. The Plaza de España complex is a huge half-circle with buildings continually running around the edge accessible over the moat by numerous beautiful bridges. In the centre is a large fountain. By the walls of the Plaza are many tiled alcoves, each representing a different province of Spain.

Selected work

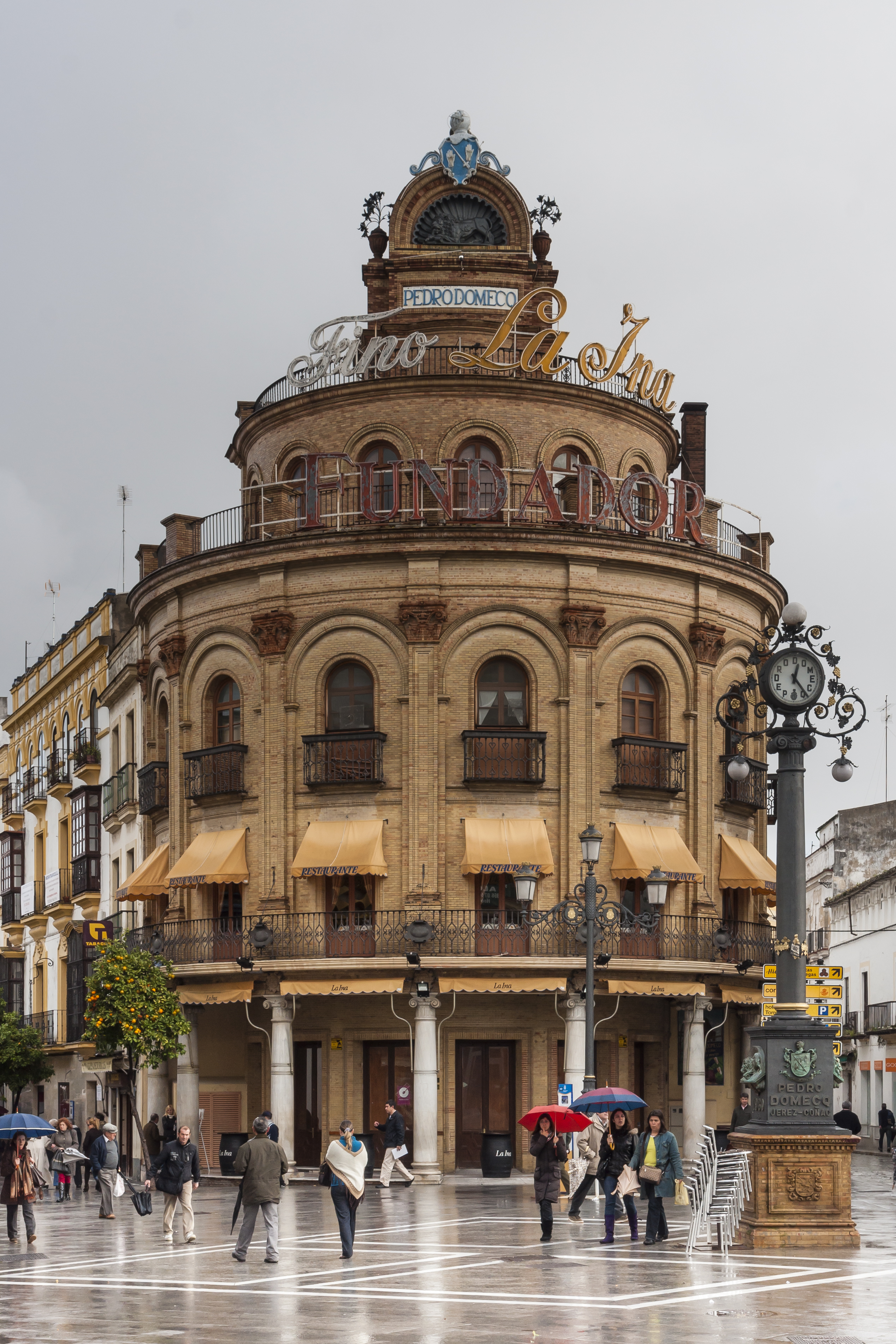
The Gallo Azul; 1927-1928; Jerez de la Frontera

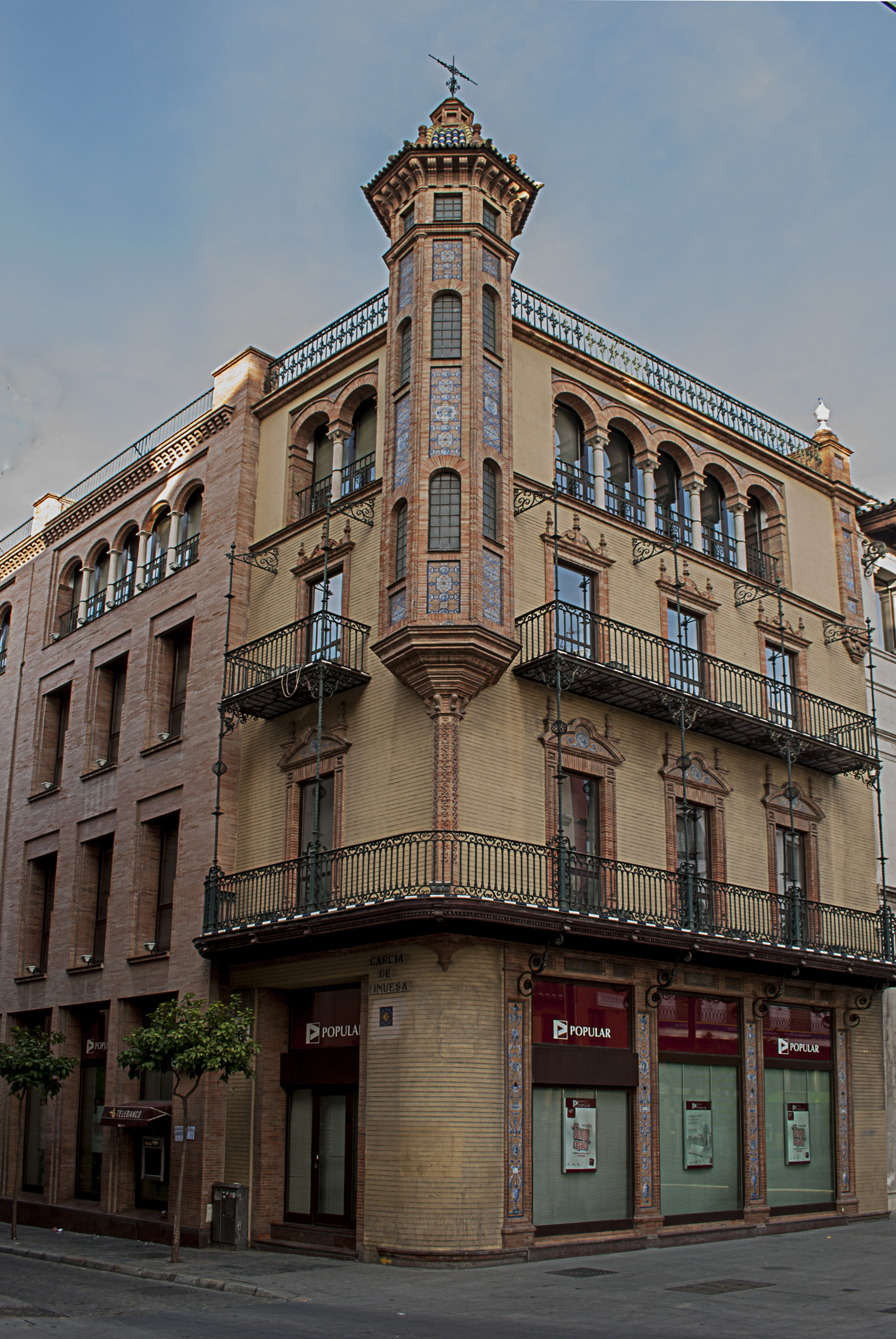
House Álvaro Dávila; 1915-1917; Seville

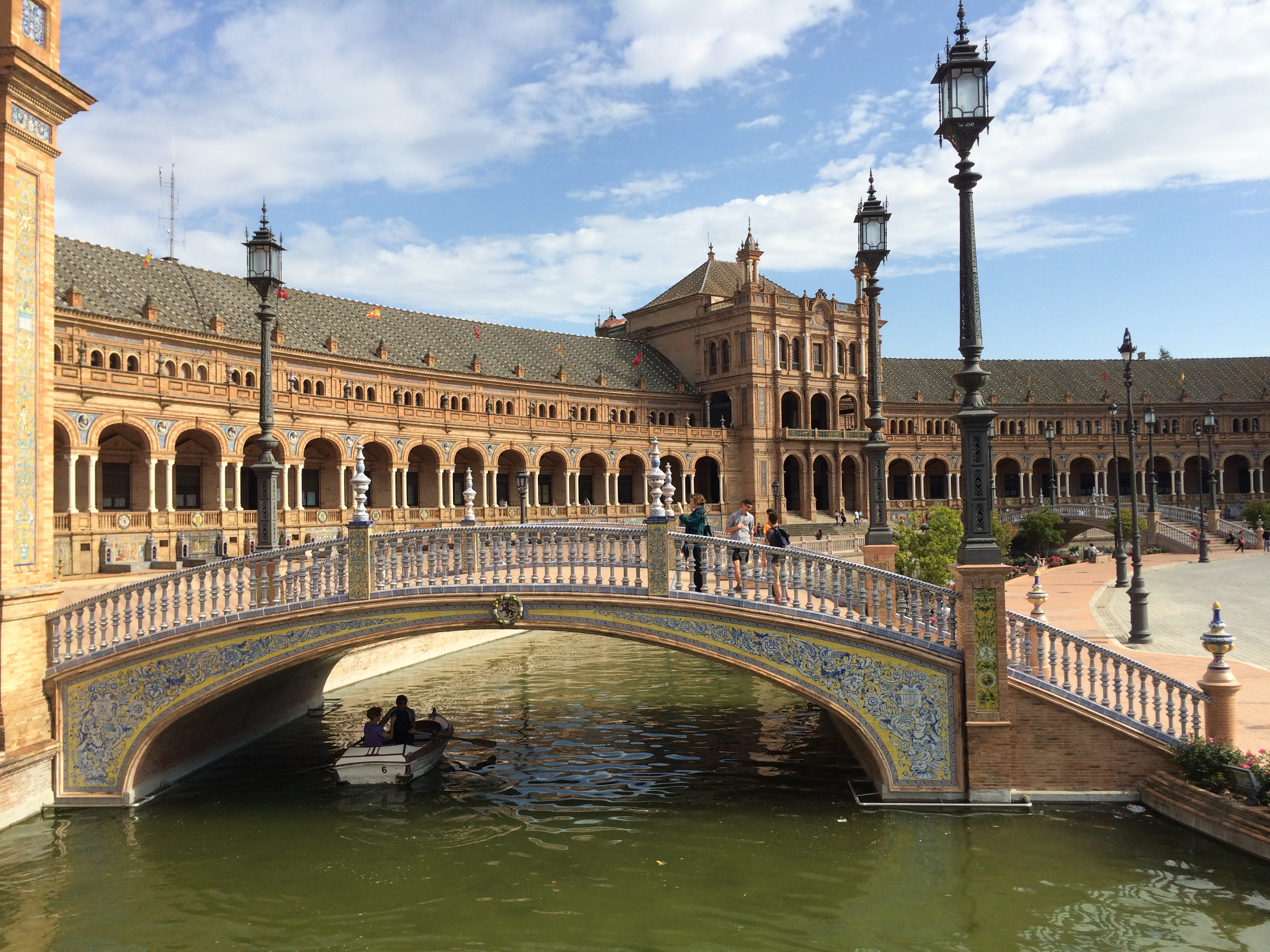
Plaza de España; 1914-1929; Seville

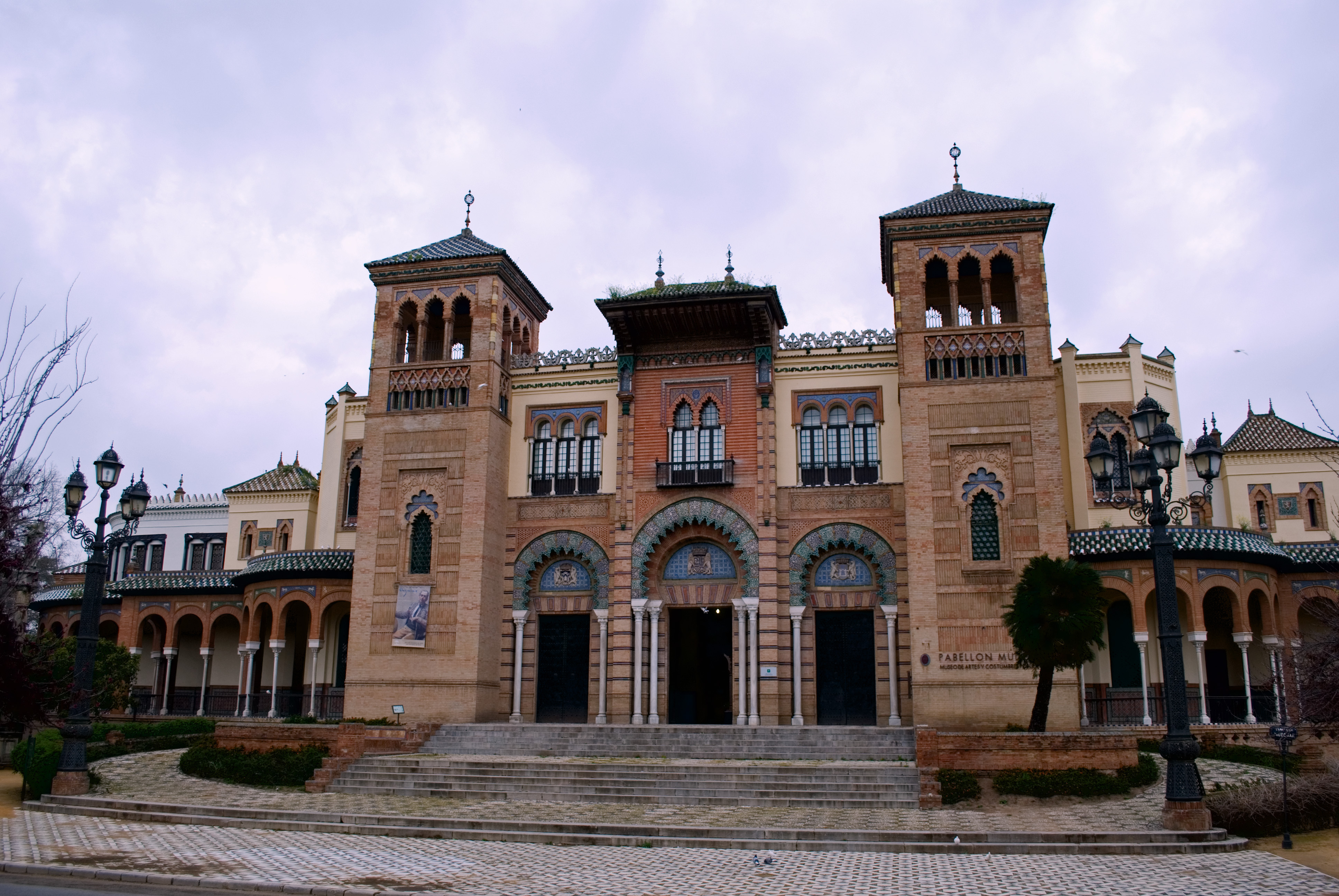
The Mudejar Pavillon; 1911-1914; Seville

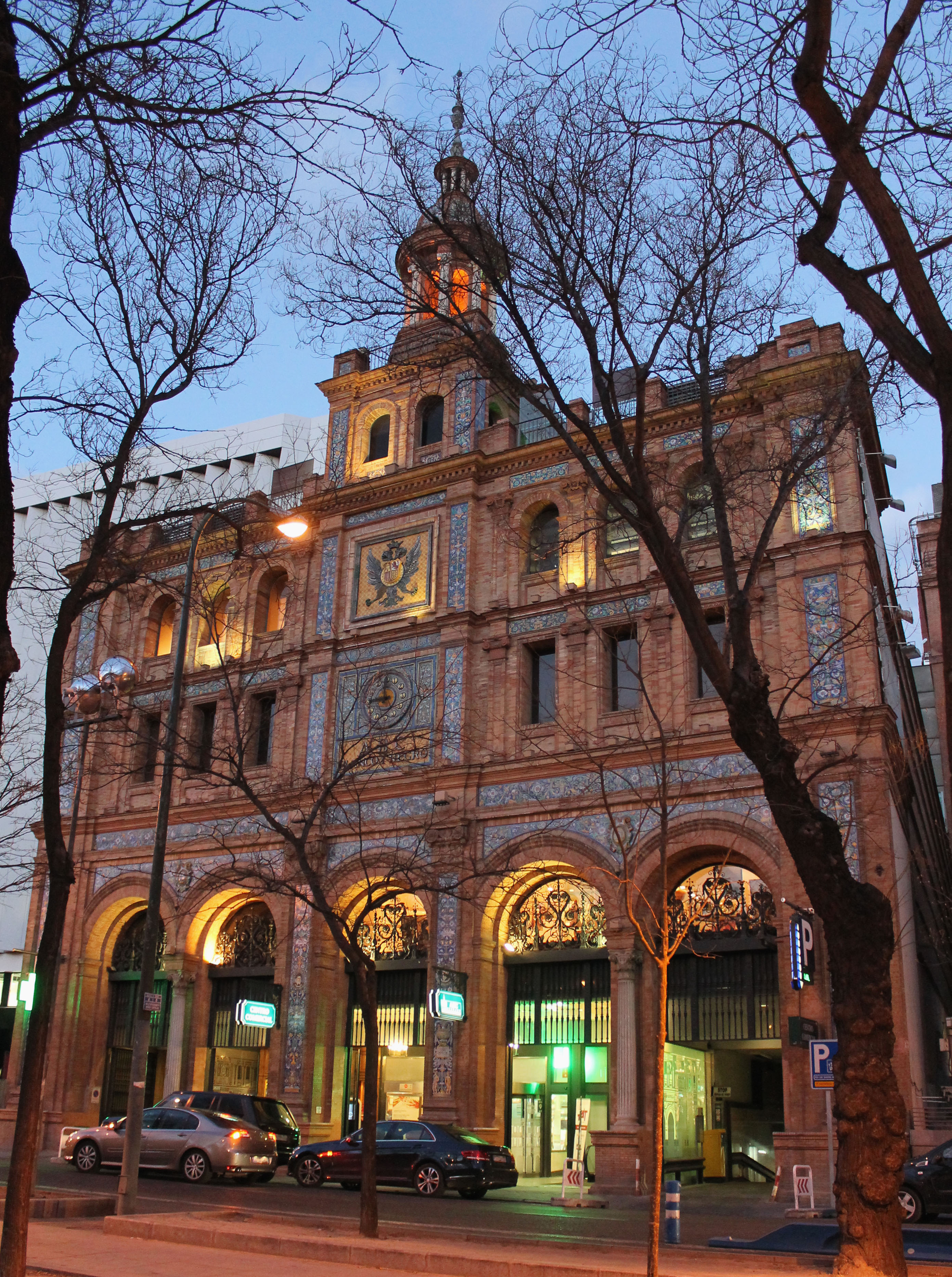
Site of ABC; 1925-1928; Madrid

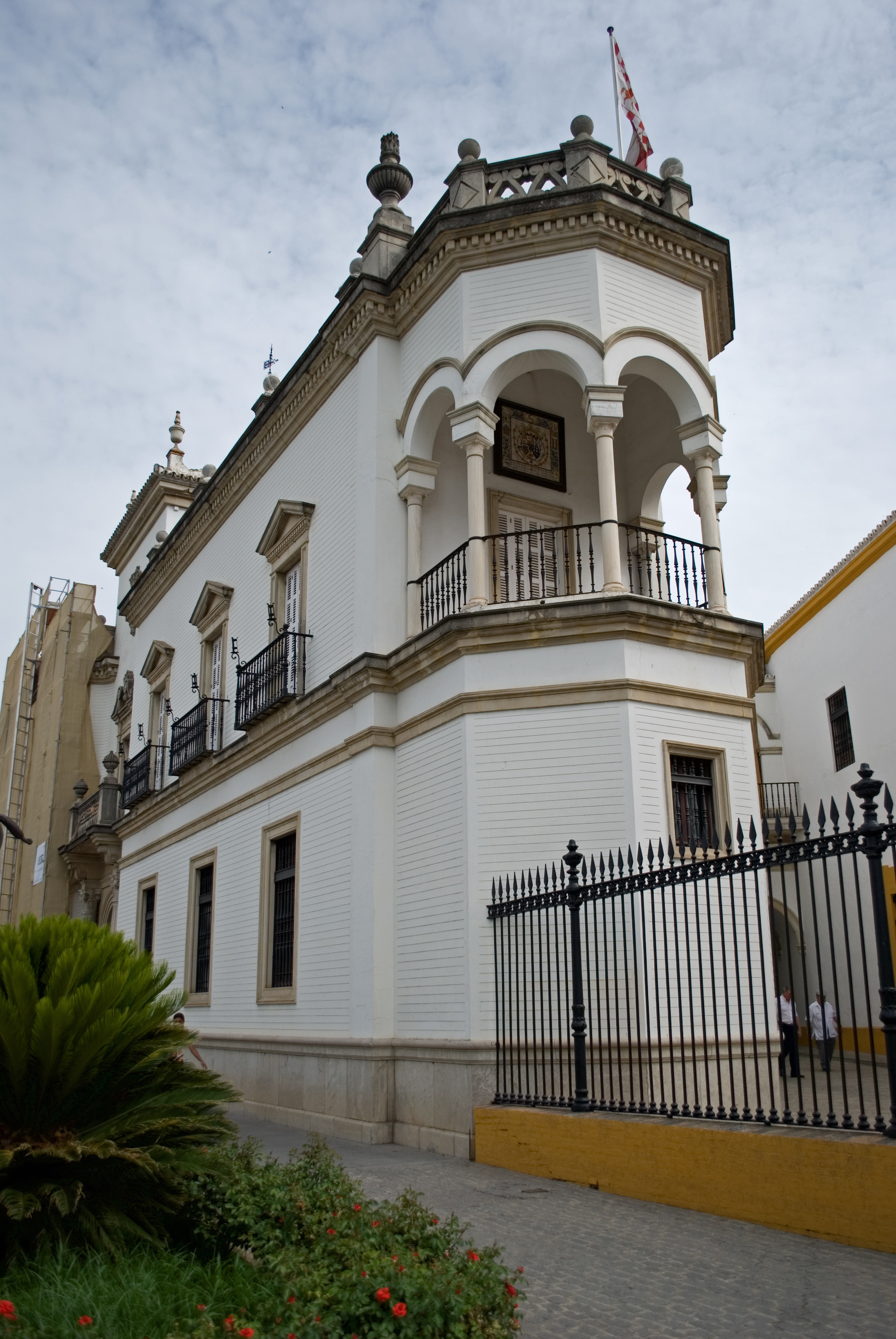
House of Maestrantes; 1927-1930; Seville
