= State Public Libraries (Spain) =

State Public Libraries in Spain

The State Public Libraries (BPE) in Spain are a group of 53 public libraries owned by the Spanish Ministry of Culture's General Sub-Directorate for the Coordination of Libraries.

== Libraries ==
Name	Address and postal code	Foundation	Coordinates	Image
Biblioteca Pública del Estado en Mérida - Jesús Delgado Valhondo	Libertad Avenue, s/n, 06800 Mérida	1999	38.914685°N 6.35741°W	
Biblioteca Regional de Murcia - Biblioteca Pública del Estado en Murcia	Juan Carlos I Avenue, 17, 30008 Murcia	1956	37.998575°N 1.137249°W	
Biblioteca Pública del Estado en Pontevedra - Antonio Odriozola	Alfonso XIII Street, 3, 36002 Pontevedra	1848	42.432451°N 8.650657°W	
Biblioteca Pública del Estado en Santiago de Compostela - Ánxel Casal	Xoán XXIII Avenue, s/n, 15704 Santiago de Compostela	1955	42.883908°N 8.544315°W	
Biblioteca Pública del Estado en Ciudad Real - Isabel Pérez Valera	Ferrocarril Avenue, s/n, 13004 Ciudad Real	1896	38.979179°N 3.932616°W	
Biblioteca Pública Provincial de Cádiz	Cuatro de Diciembre de 1977 Avenue, 16, 11006 Cádiz	1851	36.5335789299°N 6.29386735058°W	
Biblioteca Pública del Estado en Tarragona	Fortuny Street, 30, 43001 Tarragona	1846	41.113751°N 1.249934°E	
Biblioteca Pública del Estado en Orihuela - Fernando de Loazes	Ramón Sijé Square, 1, 03300 Orihuela	1863	38.08637°N 0.945613°W	
Biblioteca Pública Provincial de Huelva	Martín Alonso Pinzón Avenue, 16, 21003 Huelva	1856	37.25556908°N 6.948623689°W	
Biblioteca Pública del Estado en Toledo	Cuesta de Carlos V Street, 4, 45001 Toledo	1771	39.857534°N 4.020817°W	
Biblioteca Pública del Estado en Valencia	Hospital Street, 13, 46001 Valencia	1979	39.47089°N 0.38173°W	
Biblioteca Pública del Estado en Zamora	Claudio Moyano Street, s/n, 49001 Zamora	1846	41.501842°N 5.748213°W	
Biblioteca Pública del Estado en A Coruña - Miguel González Garcés	Miguel González Garcés Street, 1, 15008 La Coruña	1902	43.348274°N 8.40518°W	
Biblioteca Pública del Estado en Palma de Mallorca - Can Sales	Puerta de Santa Catalina Street, 24, 07012 Palma de Mallorca	1835	39.570755°N 2.642891°E	
Biblioteca Pública del Estado en Albacete	San José de Calasanz Street, 14, 02002 Albacete	1895	38.989822°N 1.854808°W	
Biblioteca Pública del Estado en Guadalajara	Dávalos Street, s/n, 19001 Guadalajara	1837	40.633987°N 3.16818°W	
Biblioteca de Asturias / Biblioteca Pública del Estado en Oviedo - Ramón Pérez de Ayala	Daoiz y Velarde Square, 11, 33009 Oviedo	1943	43.3595°N 5.846445°W	
Biblioteca Pública del Estado en Huesca	Pirineos Avenue, 2, 22004 Huesca	1857	42.141473°N 0.415534°W	
Biblioteca Pública del Estado en Melilla	España Square, 4, 52001 Melilla	1991	35.291717°N 2.938615°W	
Biblioteca Pública del Estado en Sevilla - Infanta Elena	María Luisa Avenue, 8, 41013 Sevilla	1959	37.377131°N 5.991589°W	
Biblioteca Pública Provincial de Jaén	Santo Reino Street, 1, 23003 Jaén	1985	37.772°N 3.78791°W 37.7718977594°N 3.78792570507°W	
Biblioteca Pública del Estado en León	Santa Nonia Street, 5, 24003 León	1844	42.595414°N 5.571864°W	
Biblioteca Pública Provincial de Almería Francisco Villaespesa	Hermanos Machado Street, s/n, 04004 Almería	1947	36.8358406634°N 2.46073499695°W	
Biblioteca Pública del Estado en Lleida	Rambla de Aragón Street, 10, 25002 Lérida	1842	41.613498°N 0.620199°E	
Biblioteca de Castilla y León / Biblioteca Pública del Estado en Valladolid	Trinidad Square, 2, 47003 Valladolid	1989 1931	41.657476°N 4.729756°W	
Biblioteca Pública del Estado en Gijón - Jovellanos	Jovellanos Street, 23, 33206 Gijón	1947	43.541348°N 5.662752°W	
Biblioteca Pública del Estado en Burgos	San Juan Square, s/n, 09004 Burgos	1874	42.34261111111111°N 3.696°W	
Biblioteca Pública del Estado en Zaragoza	Doctor Cerrada Street, 22, 50005 Zaragoza	1923	41.647184°N 0.889093°W	
Biblioteca Pública del Estado en Las Palmas de Gran Canaria	Muelle de Las Palmas Avenue, s/n, 35003 Las Palmas de Gran Canaria	1967	28.110526764993°N 15.416266902903°W	
Biblioteca Pública del Estado en Girona - Carles Rahola	Emili Grahit Street, 4C, 17002 Gerona	2014 1848	41.974734°N 2.819346°E	
Biblioteca Pública del Estado en Córdoba	Amador de los Ríos Street, s/n, 14004 Córdoba	1842	37.877409°N 4.780899°W	
Biblioteca Pública del Estado en Palencia	Eduardo Dato Street, 4, 34005 Palencia	1897	42.0133°N 4.53482°W	
Biblioteca Pública del Estado en Ávila	Catedral Square, 3, 05001 Ávila	1868	40.656328°N 4.697261°W	
Biblioteca Pública del Estado en Lugo	Ramón Ferreiro Avenue, 23, 27002 Lugo	1840	43.004494°N 7.553735°W	
Biblioteca Central de Cantabria / Biblioteca Pública del Estado en Santander	Ruiz de Alda Street, 19, 39009 Santander	1844	43.45429°N 3.814428°W	
Biblioteca Pública del Estado en Granada	Profesor Saínz Cantero Street, 6, 18002 Granada	1933	37.178282°N 3.606195°W	
Biblioteca Pública del Estado en Santa Cruz de Tenerife	Comodoro Rolín Street, 1, 38007 Santa Cruz de Tenerife	1977	28.4643°N 16.2665°W	
Biblioteca Pública del Estado en Málaga	Europa Avenue, 49, 29003 Málaga (Cádiz Road District)	1895	36.702686°N 4.444817°W	
Biblioteca Pública del Estado en Soria	Nicolás Rabal Street, 25, 42003 Soria	1935	41.762662°N 2.473553°W	
Biblioteca de La Rioja / Biblioteca Pública del Estado en Logroño	Merced Street, 1, 26001 Logroño	1990 1852	42.466619°N 2.448794°W	
Biblioteca Pública del Estado en Cáceres - A. Rodríguez-Moñino/M. Brey	Alfonso IX Street, 26, 10004 Cáceres	1868	39.47316°N 6.376672°W	
Biblioteca Pública del Estado en Castellón	Rafalafena Street, 29, 12003 Castellón de la Plana	1848	39.988432°N 0.030865°W	
Biblioteca Pública del Estado en Salamanca - Casa de las Conchas	Compañía Street, 2, 37002 Salamanca	1933	40.962817°N 5.666027°W	
Biblioteca Pública del Estado en Segovia	Procuradores de la Tierra Street, 6, 40006 Segovia	1842	40.93615°N 4.103559°W	
Biblioteca Pública del Estado en Cuenca - Fermín Caballero	Glorieta González Palencia Street, 1, 16002 Cuenca	1846	40.072731°N 2.139023°W	
Biblioteca Pública del Estado en Ceuta - Adolfo Suárez	Alcalde Manuel Olivencia Street, s/n, 51001 Ceuta	2013	35.887027°N 5.305446°W	
Biblioteca Pública del Estado en Ourense	Canle Street, 6, (St Francis Convent), 32004 Orense	1850	42.337037°N 7.85995°W	
Biblioteca Pública del Estado en Alicante - José Martínez Ruíz Azorín	Paseíto de Ramiro Street, 15, 03002 Alicante	1855	38.346171°N 0.477993°W	
Biblioteca Pública del Estado en Badajoz - Bartolomé J. Gallardo	Guadiana Avenue, s/n, 06011 Badajoz	1896	38.874°N 6.9882°W	
Biblioteca Pública del Estado en Vitoria-Gasteiz - Casa de Cultura Ignacio Aldecoa	Paseo de la Florida Avenue, 9, 01005 Vitoria	1896	42.844104°N 2.675238°W	
Biblioteca Pública del Estado en Maó	Conquista Square, 8, 07701 Mahón	1861	39.889696°N 4.265043°E	
Biblioteca Pública del Estado en Madrid - Manuel Alvar	Azcona Street, 42, 28028 Madrid	1988	40.434338°N 3.669126°W	
Biblioteca Pública del Estado en Teruel - Javier Sierra	Obispo Pérez Prado Square, 3, 44001 Teruel	1953	40.3441°N 1.109657°W	
