= List of libraries in Spain =

This is a list of libraries in Spain.

== National libraries ==
- National Library of Spain

== Autonomous community libraries ==
- Andalusia Library
- Aragon Library
- Asturias Library
- Central Library of Cantabria
- Castile and Leon Library
- Castile-La Mancha Library
- Library of Catalonia
- Extremadura Library
- Library of Galicia
- La Rioja Library
- Madrid Regional Library
- Murcia Regional Library
- Navarre Library
- Valencian Library

== Public libraries ==
=== Andalusia ===
- Almería Public Library
- Cádiz Public Library
- Córdoba Public Library
- Granada Public Library
- Huelva Public Library
- Jaén Public Library
- Málaga Public Library
- Seville Public Library
- Jerez Central Public Library (es)
- Algeciras Municipal Library

=== Catalonia ===
- Lleida Public Library

=== Valencian Community ===
- Public Library of Valencia

=== Other ===
- Toledo Public Library (Spain)

== University libraries ==
- University of Santiago de Compostela Library
- University of Salamanca Library
- University of Barcelona Library
- University of Seville Library
- University of Valladolid Library

== Other libraries ==
- Library of the Monastery of San Lorenzo de El Escorial

== See also ==
- Books in Spain
- Library associations in Spain
- List of libraries
- List of libraries in Barcelona
- List of archives in Spain
- List of museums in Spain
- Open access in Spain

== Bibliography ==
- "Spain". World Guide to Libraries 2014. Vol. 2 (28th ed.). Germany: De Gruyter Saur. 2014. ISBN 9783110302486 – via Internet Archive.
- Lawrence J. Olszewski (2016). "Spain". Encyclopedia of Library and Information Science (4th ed.). US. ISBN 9781466552593.
