= Cruz y Ortiz =

Spanish architecture firm

Cruz y Ortiz arquitectos is an architectural studio founded by Antonio Cruz Villalón and Antonio Ortiz García. The studio have offices in Seville and in Amsterdam.

== Biography ==
Architect Antonio Cruz Villalón was born in Seville, Spain, in 1948, and graduated from the Superior Technical School of Architecture of Madrid in 1971. He is a member of the Andalusian Architects' Association (Num. 953). Antonio Ortiz was born in Seville in 1947, and graduated from the same university in 1974. He is a member of the Andalusian Architects' Association (num. 1206). After graduating, he worked with Ricardo Aroca and Rafael Moneo. From 1974 they taught at the Escuela de Arquitectura, Seville. They also taught at prestigious institutions around the world, such as Eidgenössische Technische Houchschule (ETH) in Zurich and Harvard Graduate School of Design.

== Work ==
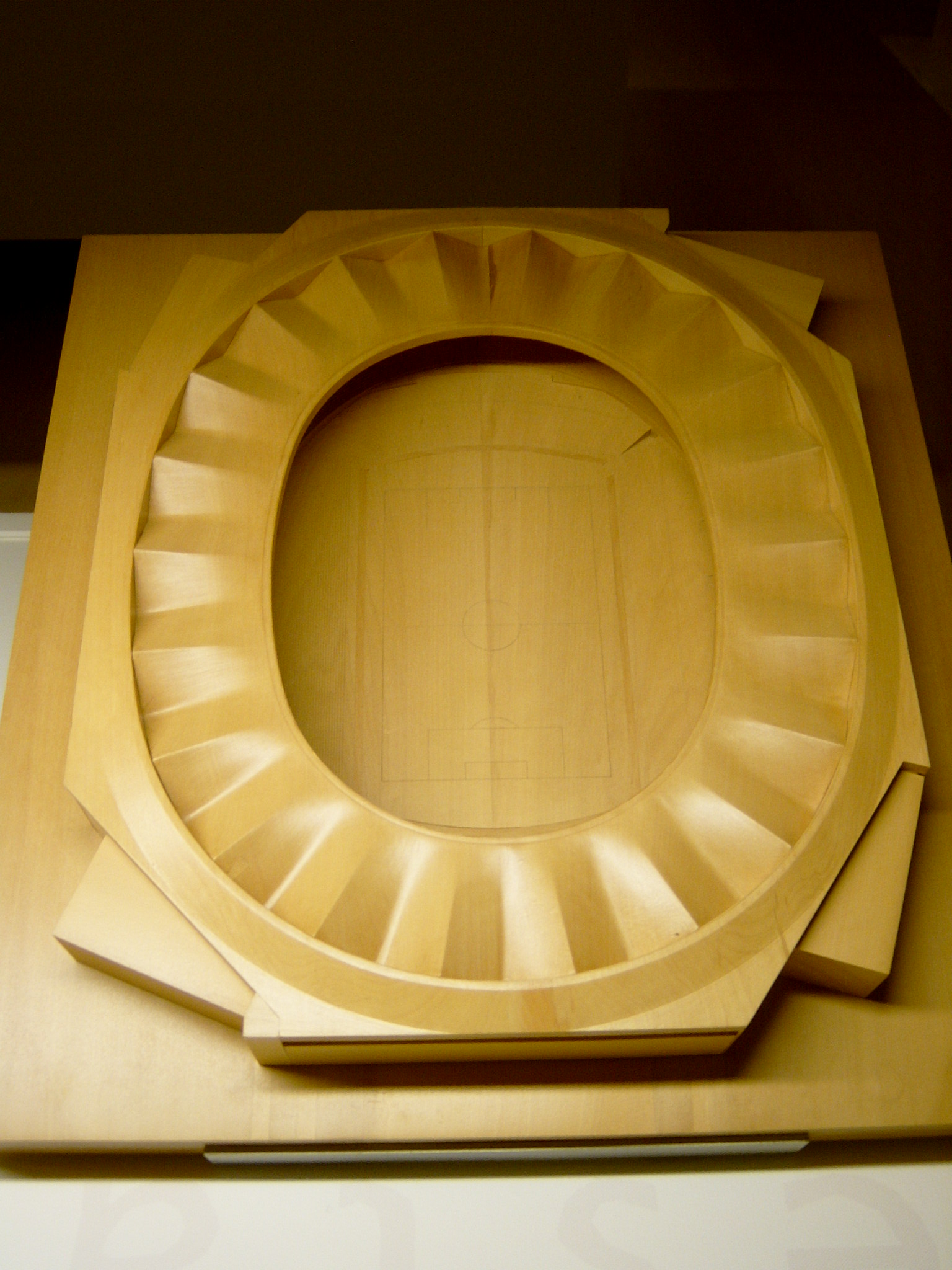
Model of the Olympic Stadium at Seville, Spain

- 1973–1976 Housing project at C/ Doña María Coronel, Seville. Spain
- 1977–1980 Housing project at C/ Lumbreras, Seville. Spain
- 1981–1986 Adaptation for the Historic Provincial Archive of the Casa de las Cadenas, Cádiz. Spain
- 1982–1987 Adaptation of the Old Courthouse Building into the State Historical Archive and Municipal Archives, Seville. Spain
- 1986–1989 Housing project at Caravanchel, Madrid. Spain
- 1986–1989 Adaptation of the Candelaria Bulwork to a Maritime Museum, Cádiz. Spain
- 1987–1992 Santa Justa Train Station, Seville. Spain
- 1988–1992 Housing project in Tharsis, Huelva. Spain
- 1988–1991 Spanish Cultural Institute, Lisbon. Portugal
- 1989 Spanish Pavilion at the Expo 92, Seville. Spain. Competition.
- 1989–1994 Madrid Community Sports Stadium, Madrid. Spain
- 1990–1994 Huelva Bus Terminal. Spain
- 1991–1995 New Headquarters for the Seville Provincial Government. Spain
- 1994–1996 Java-Eiland Residential Complex, Amsterdam. The Netherlands
- 1994–1995 Port buildings in Cádiz, Spain.
- 1995–1999 Seville Public Library, Seville. Spain
- 1997–2003 Remodellation and enlargement of the SBB Train Station, Basel. Switzerland
- 1997–2000 Seville Olympic Stadium. Spain
- 1998–2000 Spanish Pavilion at World Expo 2000 Hannover. Germany
- 1999–2002 Patio Sevilla, housing complex, Maastricht. The Netherlands
- 2002–2010 Twin towers in the Wilheminapier in Rotterdam. Project in redaction.
- 2002– Masterplan of the Olympic Ring for Madrid 2012. Project in redaction
- 2003–2013 Enlargement of Rijksmuseum in Amsterdam. The Netherlands.
- 2009–2017 Estadio La Peineta, Madrid, Spain. Project in redaction.

== Awards ==
- 1980 Perez Carasa Award for the Single-family Housing Unit in Punta Umbria, granted by the Professional Association of Architects of the Western Andalusia/Huelva Area.
- 1982 City of Seville Award for new buildings for the housing block on Lumbreras Street, granted by the Seville City Council.
- 1989 Award for Best New Building from the Madrid City Council for the Carabanchel Housing Project.
- 1990 Finalists in Mies van der Rohe Pavilion Award for European Architecture for the Carabanchel Housing Project in Madrid.
- 1992 Brunel 92 International Award for Railway Design for the Santa Justa Train Station in Seville.
- 1992 Finalists in Mies van der Rohe Pavilion Award for European Architecture for the Santa Justa Train Station in Seville
- 1993 Spanish Architecture Award for the Santa Justa Station in Seville, granted by the Governing Council of the Professional Colleges of Architects of Spain and the Ministry of Public Works, Transport and Environment.
- 1995 Architecture Award of the Professional Association of Architects of Western Andalusia for 1994 for New Building for the Huelva Bus Terminal.
- 1997 Spanish Entrepreneurs' Foundation Award, granted by the C.E.O.E. Foundation (Confederación Española de Organizaciones Empresariales), Madrid, for the Madrid Community Sports Stadium.
- 1997 Andalusian Gold Medal Award, granted by the Andalusian Regional Government and the Andalusian Parliament, for the whole of their work.
- 1998 National Sports Award 1998. National Award for Sports' Architecture, granted by the Consejo Superior de Deporte (Ministry for Culture and Education), Madrid, for the Madrid Community Sports Stadium and the Olympic Stadium in Seville.
- 1999 Eduardo Torroja Award for the Olympic Stadium in Seville, granted by the Ministerio de Fomento (Ministry for Development).
- 2003 Heimatschutz Prize, granted by Basler Heimatschutz, Basilea, for the Remodellation and enlargement of the SBB Train Station, Basel. Switzerland
- 2004 José Manuel Lara Foundation Culture Awards. Plastic Arts Award for their work as a whole.
- 2006 Special mention Daylight Award awarded by Velux Stiftung, Swiss, for "The Redesign and Extension of the Train Station SBB", Basilea (Swiss).
- 2008 Andalusian Architect Award, for the Remodellation and enlargement of the SBB Train Station, Basel. Switzerland.
