= Pontevedra Public Library =

Library in Pontevedra, Spain

Pontevedra State Public Library
- Biblioteca Pública de Pontevedra Antonio Odriozola
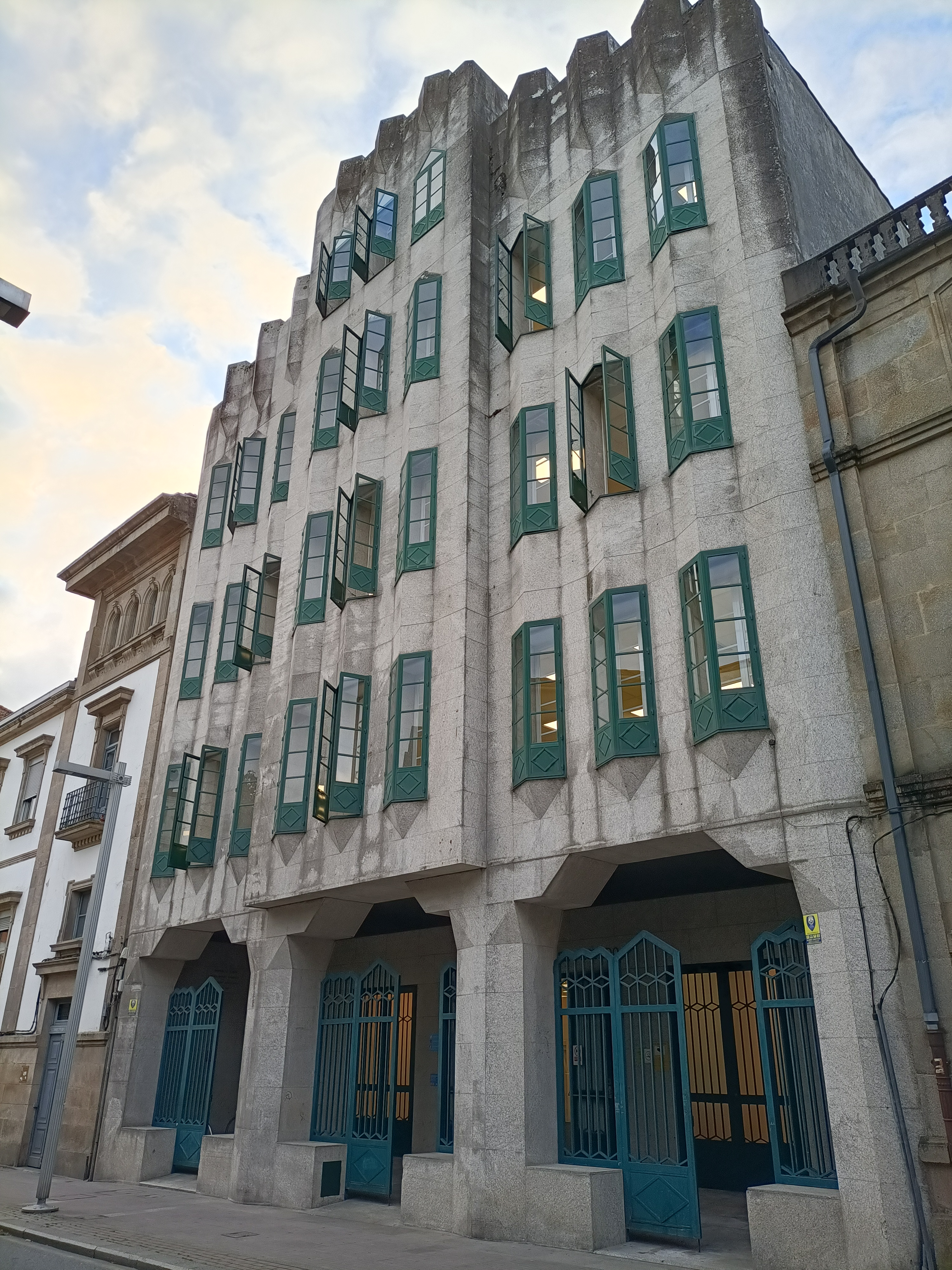
- Pontevedra Public Library building
- 42.432451°N 8.650657°W
- Location: Pontevedra, Spain
- Type: Public library
- Established: February 2, 1849
- Architect: Julio Simonet Barrio
- Branch of: State Public Libraries

Collection
- Legal deposit: yes

Other information
- Website: Official website

Spanish Cultural Heritage
- Type: Non-movable
- Criteria: Library
- Designated: 25 June 1985
- Reference no.: RI-BI-0000025

The Public Library of Pontevedra Antonio Odriozola located in Pontevedra (Spain) is the provincial state library in the province of Pontevedra and is part of the Public Library Network of Galicia and the State Public Library Network (BPE). Its management has been transferred to the Autonomous Community of Galicia through the Department of Culture of the Galician Government.

It is dedicated to Antonio Odriozola Pietas (1911–1987), who was born in Vitoria. He settled in Pontevedra in 1964, where he carried out much of his work as a bibliographer, researcher and erudite.

== Location ==
The Pontevedra Public Library is located at number 3 Alfonso XIII Street, next to the Barca Bridge.

== History ==
The Public Library of Pontevedra was created in 1848, when it received the old collections confiscated from the monasteries and convents suppressed by the Spanish confiscation. It was installed in the Provincial High School of Secondary Education, in the former Jesuit College, opening on 2 February 1849.

Throughout its history, it has had several locations. At first, in 1907, it was located in the Palace of the Deputation of Pontevedra, then in the archives of the Provincial Finance Office and finally in the Valle-Inclán High School in 1931. In 1960, it was moved to the Fonseca House, then called the House of Culture, sharing space with the Historical Archive of the Province of Pontevedra.

In order to put an end to the situation of lack of space and shortage suffered by the Fonseca House and the library, and after examining several possible locations, on 7 September 1984 the Ministry of Culture bought a plot of land used as a garage by the La Unión bus company, in Alfonso XIII street. The Ministry of Culture built a new five-storey building for the library (basement, ground floor and four floors).

The project was carried out by Ministry of Culture architect Julio Simonet Barrio. He designed a building of 3,300 square metres (36,000 ft^{2}) spread over five floors, with three reading rooms for 200 people each, a meeting and conference room, an audio library and an exhibition room, as well as four large storage rooms with a total capacity of 280,000 books. At the end of 1987, the library moved to this location and the building was inaugurated on 21 January 1988.

In 1989 the management of the library was taken over by the Xunta de Galicia.

On 28 April 1995, the Pontevedra Public Library was named after Antonio Odriozola, in honour of his work as a bibliographer and researcher in the library's collections.

== Collections ==
The library has a children's library organised by age, a library of adult literature, a section of informative books organised by UDC (Universal Decimal Classification), a reference section, a local collection on themes and authors from Pontevedra, including Legal deposit, a library of newspapers and audiovisual documents, a section of comics of all genres (adventures, graphic novels, humour, fantasy, science-fiction). The collection is complemented by the special collection of heritage material built up throughout its history, and an accessible collection of special materials adapted for disabled users.

=== Special collections ===
The library also holds the following collections:

- Collection of the Archaeological Society of Pontevedra and the Casto Sampedro collection.
- Books in homage to Antonio Losada Diéguez.
- Muruais Library (1946), with French and English works on literature and art (mainly from the 19th century).
- Part of the library of the Mendoza sisters.
- Part of the library of Professor Carlos Villar.
- The library has 10 incunables, 20 manuscripts and 1849 rare books from the 16th, 17th and 18th centuries.

== Services ==
The library offers the following services:

- Consultation in the reading room.
- Loans (individual, group and interlibrary).
- Loan of laptops and e-book readers.
- Research and/or local section.
- Information and Reference Service (general information and bibliographic and reference information).
- User training.
- Guided tours.
- Document reproduction service (photocopying).
- Group work rooms; meeting and conference room; exhibition room (possibility of reserving rooms).
- Accessible library.

The library also offers electronic library services, including access to the Galician Library Network catalogue, access to electronic documents on physical media, public Internet access, Wi-Fi and office automation.

The Pontevedra library also carries out activities such as exhibitions and bibliographic presentations, learning activities (languages, office automation, Internet navigation, etc.) or the promotion of reading and book discussion clubs.

== Gallery ==
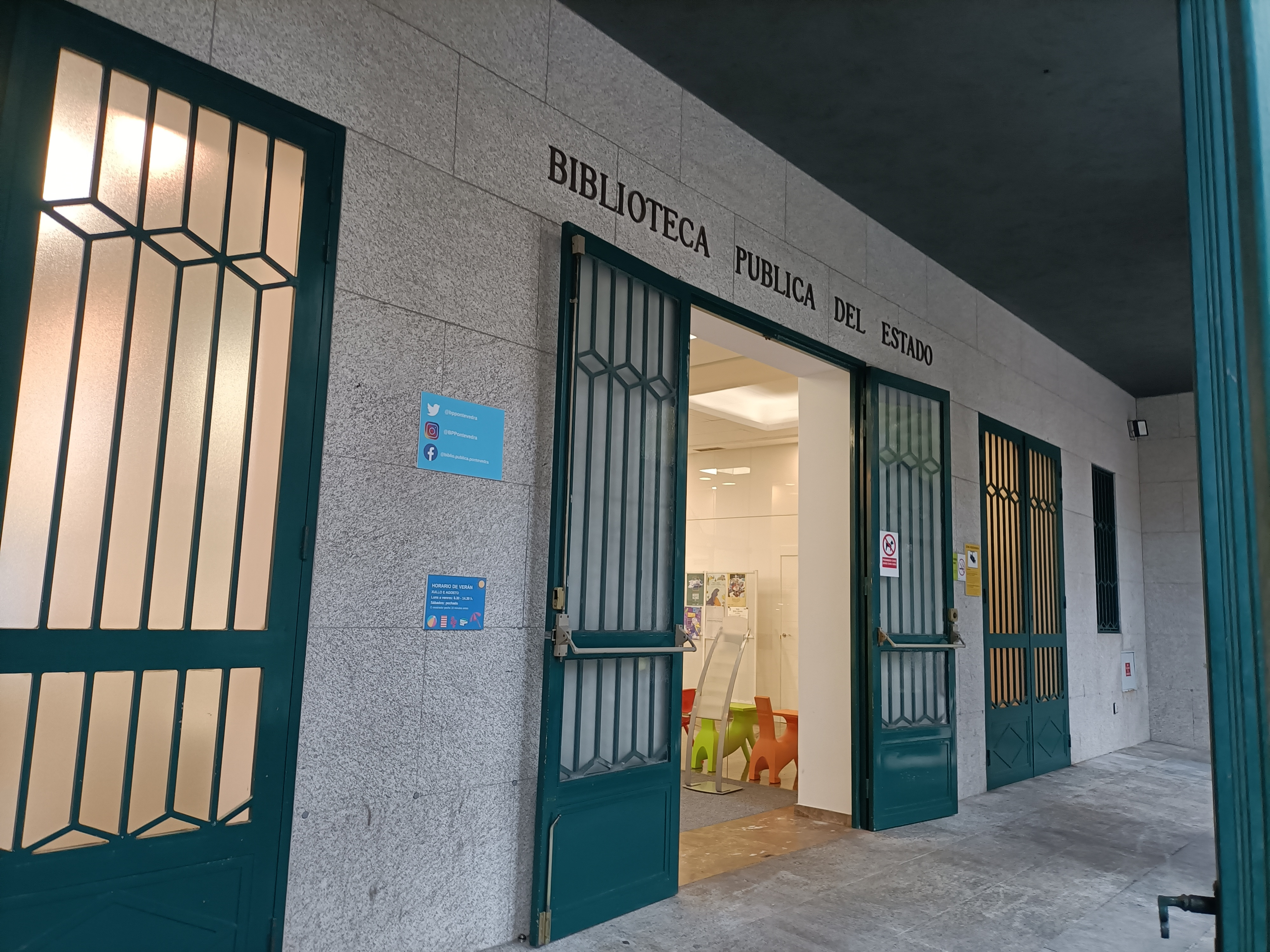
Entrance

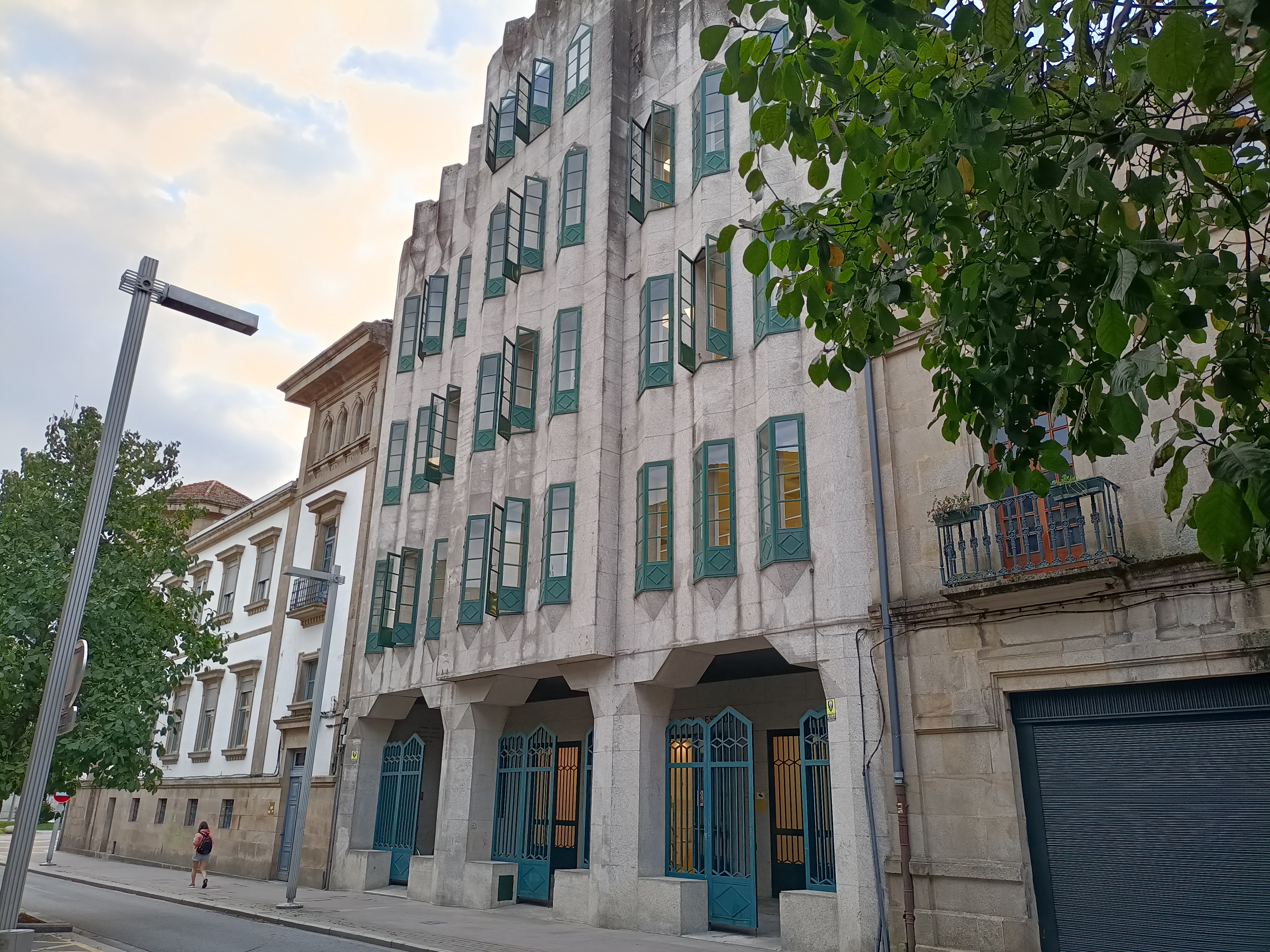
Façade on Alfonso XIII Street

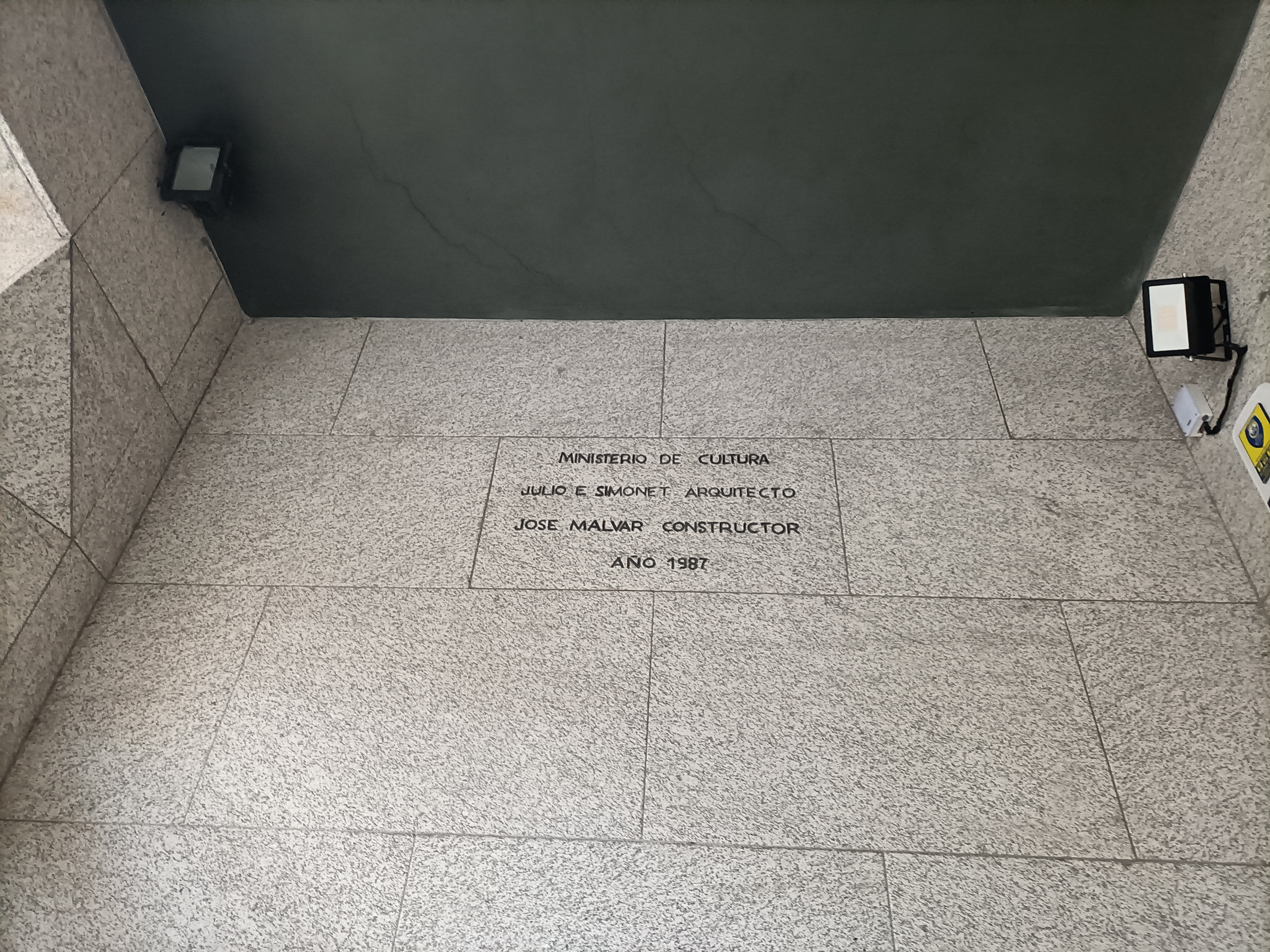
Inscription with the name of the architect and the year 1987

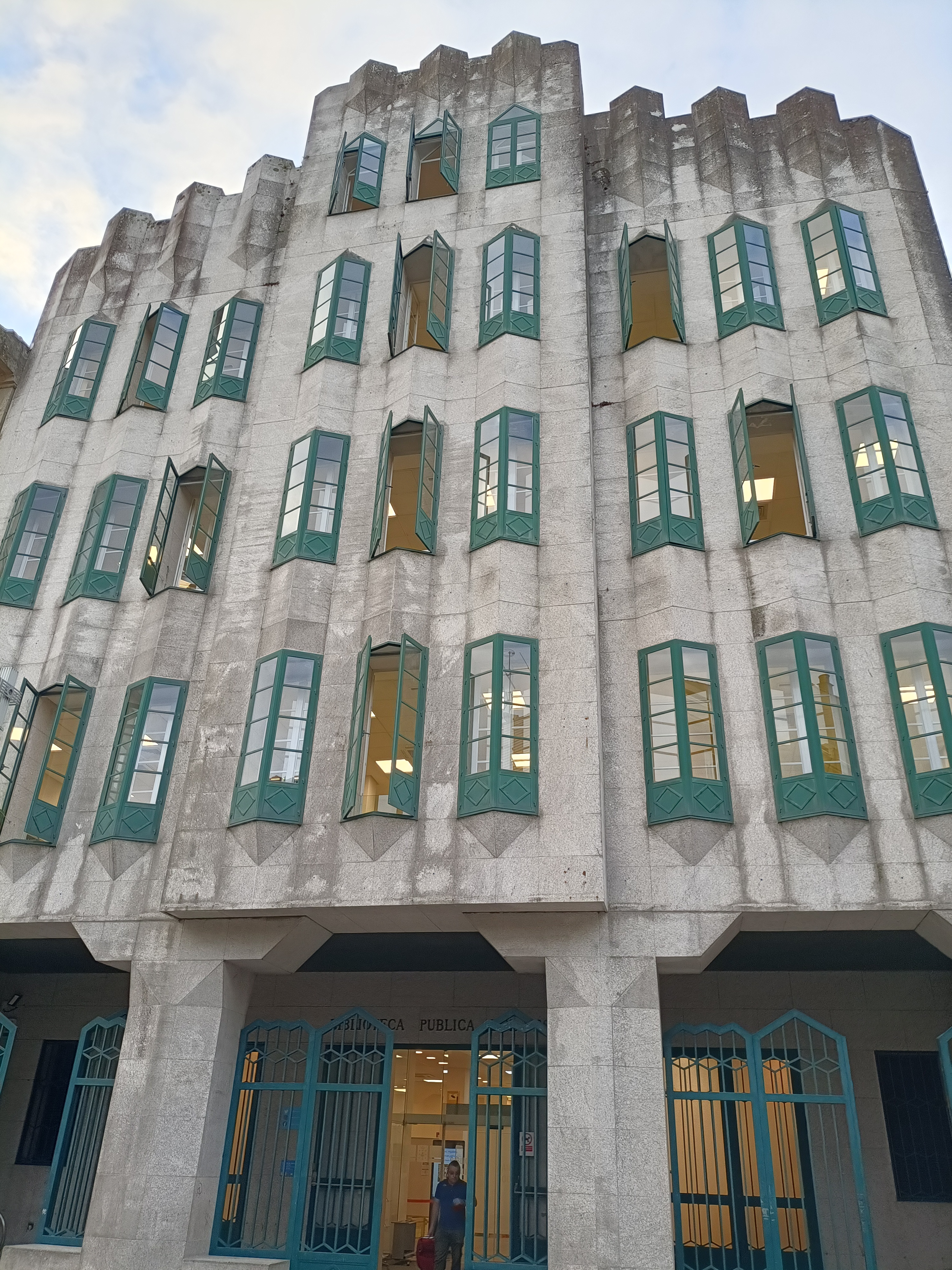
Front view

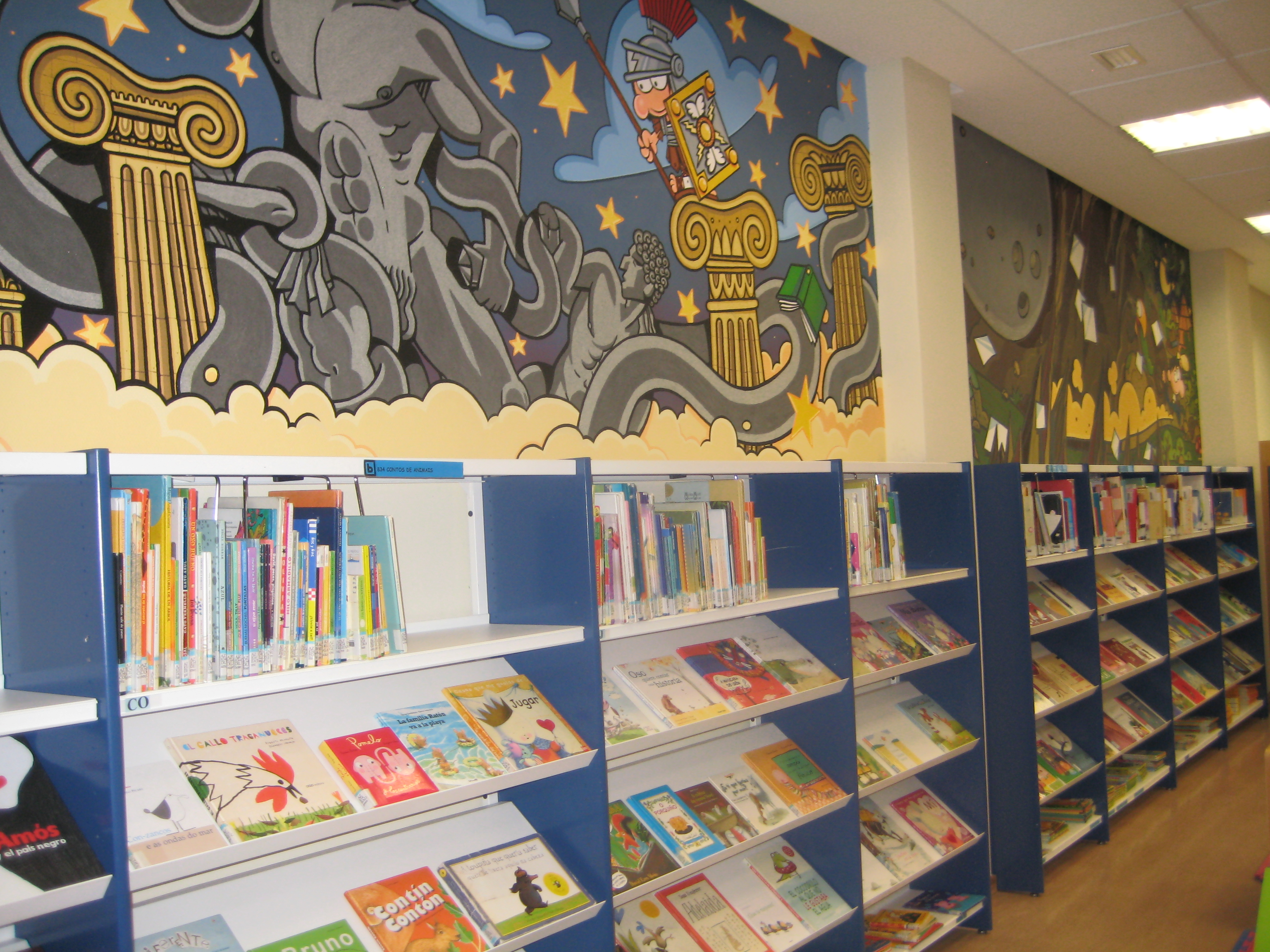
Children's room on the first floor

== Bibliography ==
- Las bibliotecas públicas del estado (in Spanish). Madrid: Ministerio de Educación, Cultura y Deporte. Área de Cultura. 1991. ISBN 978-8474837599.

== Related articles ==
- State Public Libraries (Spain)
