= Almería Public Library =

Library in Almería, Spain

Coordinates: 36.8359°N 2.4607°W

- Biblioteca Francisco Villaespesa
- Alternative names: Francisco Villaespesa Library

General information
- Location: Almería, Calle Hermanos Machado, Spain
- Year built: Original: 1947 New: 1983

Design and construction
- Architects: New: Gonzalo Hernández Guarch and Juan Manuel López Torres

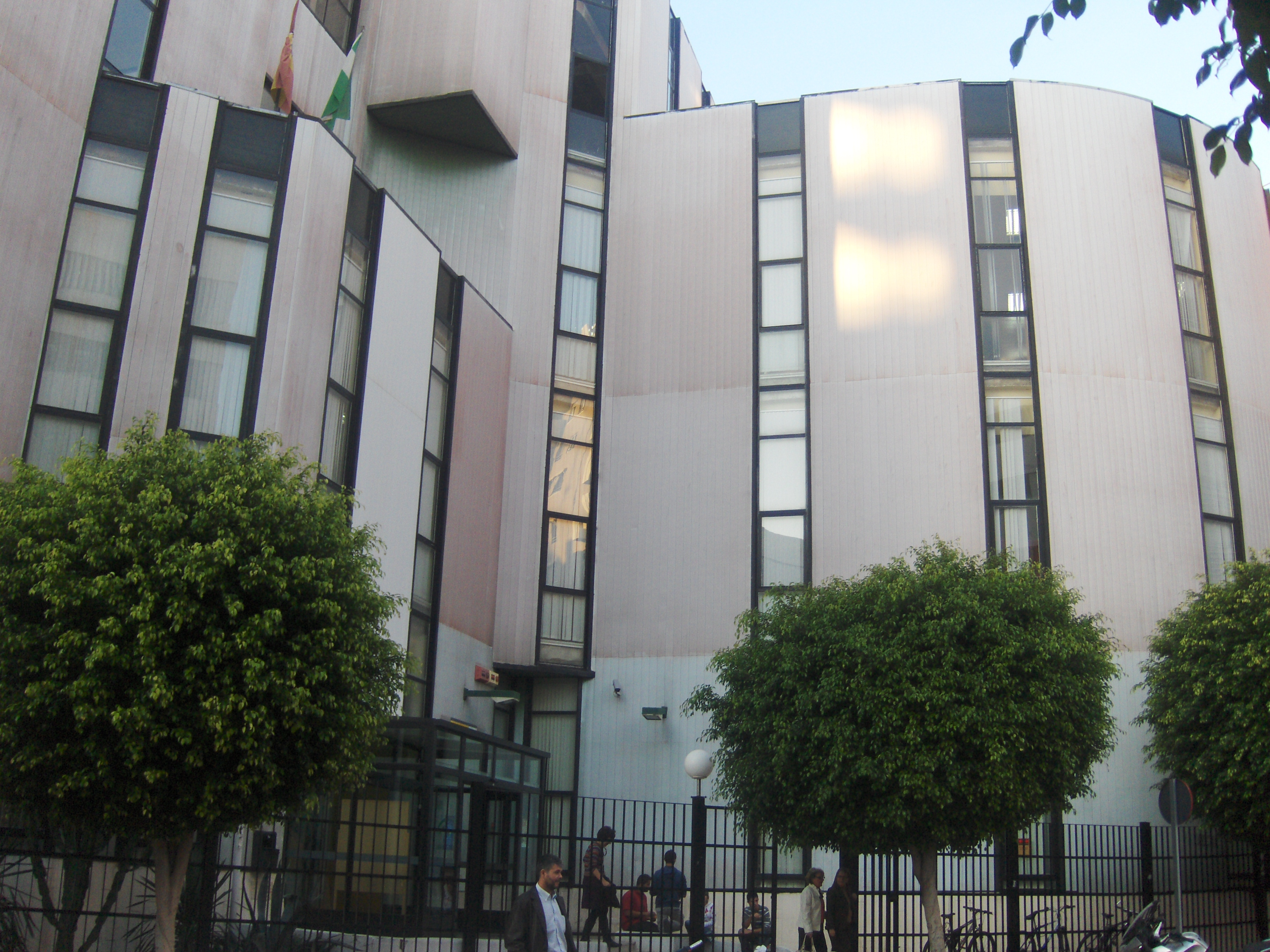

The Almería Public Library is a public library located in Almería, Spain.

== History ==
Its origins date back to 1845, when the library of the Almería Provincial Secondary School was established with 500 books. In 1947, through an agreement between the Almería City Council and the Ministry of Education, a public library was created and named after the Almerian modernist poet Francisco Villaespesa. It was initially located on the central Paseo de Almería.

In 1983, its facilities moved to its current location on Calle Hermanos Machado. The following year, it became part of the group of Provincial Libraries whose management was transferred to the Regional Government of Andalusia.

It is state-owned, part of the Spanish Library System, and attached to the Ministry of Culture through the Directorate General for Books, Archives and Libraries. Its management, however, is regional, and it is organizationally attached to the provincial delegation of the Regional Ministry of Culture of the Andalusian Government, although it receives occasional technical support from the Sub-Directorate General for Library Coordination of the Ministry of Culture.

== Collection ==
Aside from its general collections, it holds a collection of works printed in Almería, and its historical holdings include collections of local subjects, such as the collection of pamphlets belonging to the Martínez de Castro family, 19th-century newspapers like La Crónica Meridional, and manuscripts by Francisco Villaespesa and Antonio Ledesma. One of the most important titles in its collection is Robert Estienne's Latin Thesaurus, dated 1551.

== Building ==
Designed by architects Gonzalo Hernández Guarch and Juan Manuel López Torres in 1983, it features an organic floor plan and irregular volume. Its greenish cladding creates an effect characteristic of the surrounding architectural environment.

As with all state-owned archives, libraries, and museums in Spain, the building is considered a cultural heritage site.

== See also ==
- List of libraries in Spain
