= Algeciras Municipal Library =

Public library in Algericas, Spain

Coordinates: 36°08′56″N 5°27′37″W

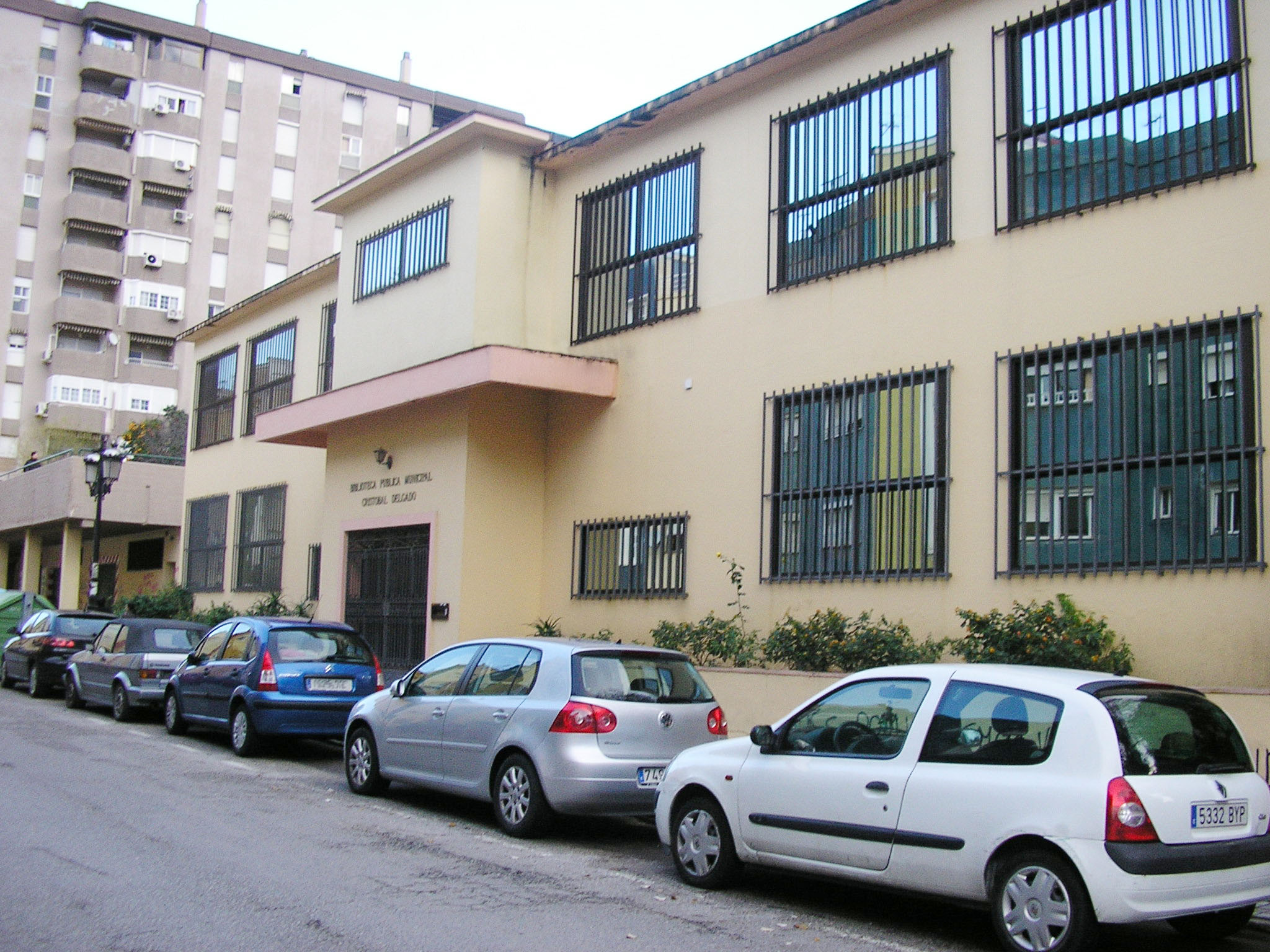
The Algeciras Municipal Library is currently headquartered at the Biblioteca Cristóbal Delgado.

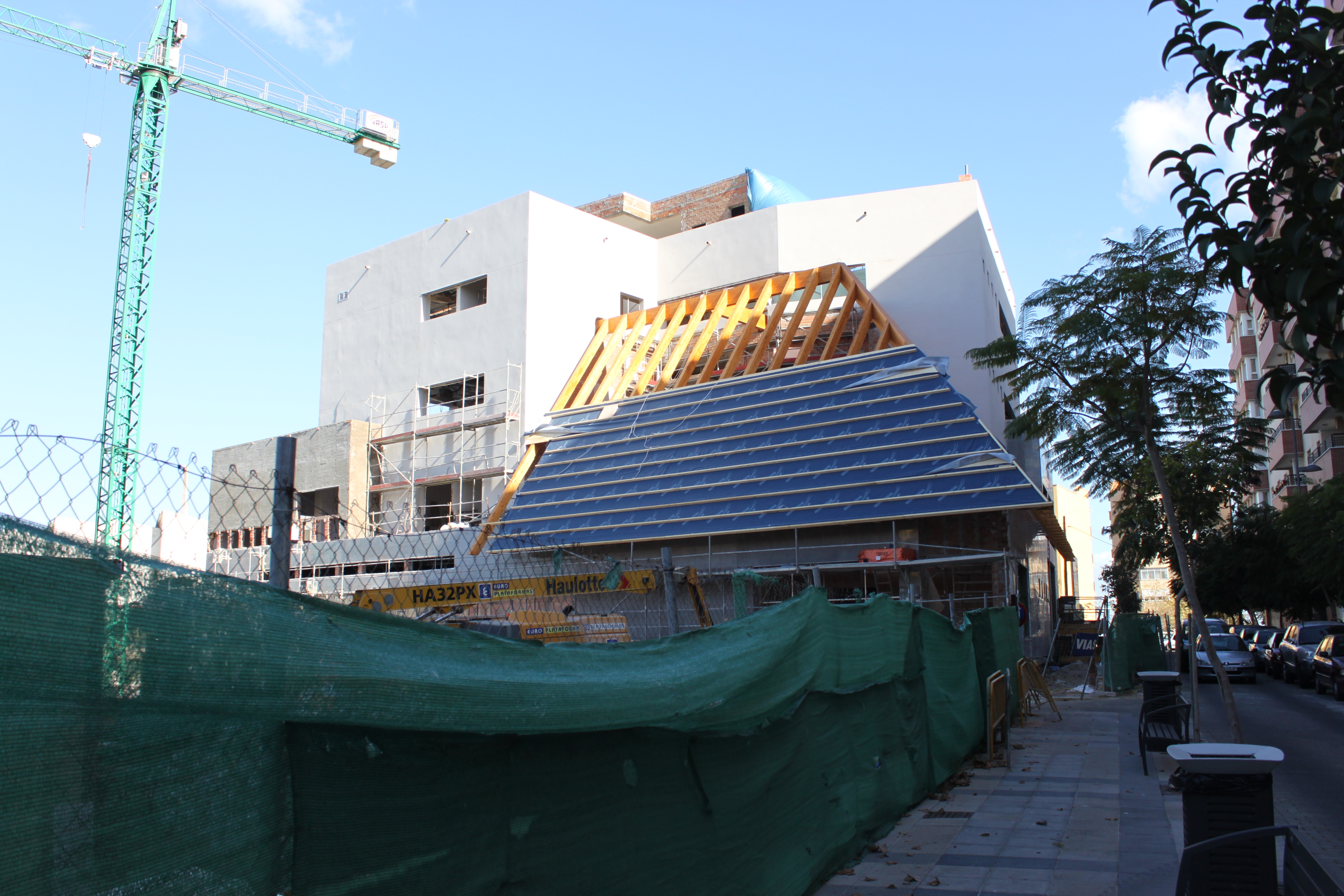
Construction of the new building which will house the municipal library headquarters and the city's historical archive.

Algeciras Municipal Library (Spanish: biblioteca municipal de Algeciras) is a public library network in Algeciras, Spain. Its headquarters are at the Biblioteca Cristóbal Delgado (Library Christopher Delgado), located on Salvador Allende Street. There are two branches, including one in the Saladillo neighborhood, Biblioteca El Saladillo, and another in the La Granja neighborhood, Biblioteca Pérez Petinto. In addition to its book collection and reference materials, the institution offers a variety of cultural activities such as a book club. The library is run by the municipality. It was established in 1925 by the local historian Manuel Pérez-Petinto y Costa.

== History ==
The city's first public library was established on the ground floor of City Hall at the initiative of the city historian, Manuel Pérez-Petinto and Costa, on August 12, 1925. During the 1940s, the Postal Service moved into the building, which caused the library to be moved to the county fair hall of Algeciras. In 1959, refurbishments at the fair grounds and urbanization of Avenida Francisco Franco (now Fuerzas Armadas) forced the library to relocate to the headquarters of the Society for the Promotion of Algeciras building on the same street.

Subsequent to the death of Juan Pérez Arriete (d. 1961), the local chronicler, the library came under the management of the city historian, Cristóbal Delgado Gómez, in 1963. He moved the library in the following year to a new building in Calle Salvador Allende. The building was remodeled and expanded through the mid-1990s, doubling the study areas, expanding the capacity by almost 10,000 volumes, and the addition of a new hall. At the initiative of then Mayor Patricio Gonzalez Gomez, the building was renamed on April 25, 1995, as the Library Christopher Delgado.

In 2010, the City Council moved forward with a project to build a new library on the grounds of the former barracks next to the Escuela de Artes y Oficios de Algeciras; its design was awarded to the municipal architect Pedro Martinez Perez-Blanco. In addition to the library, the new building will house the notary files and the municipal historical archive.
