= Jaén Public Library =

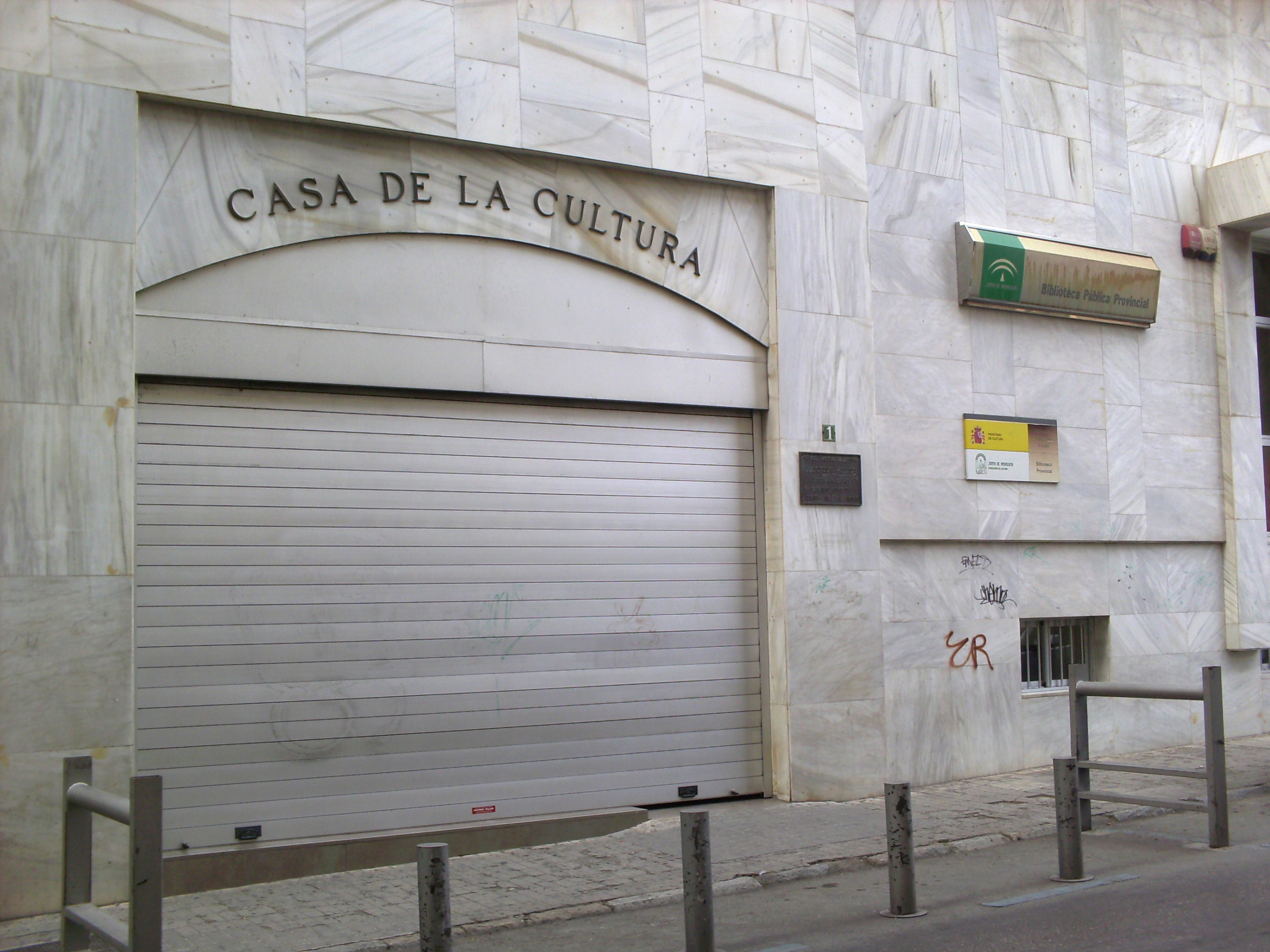
- 37°46′19″N 3°47′16″W
- Location: Jaén, Spain
- Established: 1985

Other information
- Website: Official website

The Jaén Public Library is a public library located in Jaén, Spain.

== See also ==
- List of libraries in Spain
