= Huelva Public Library =

Public library in Huelva, Spain

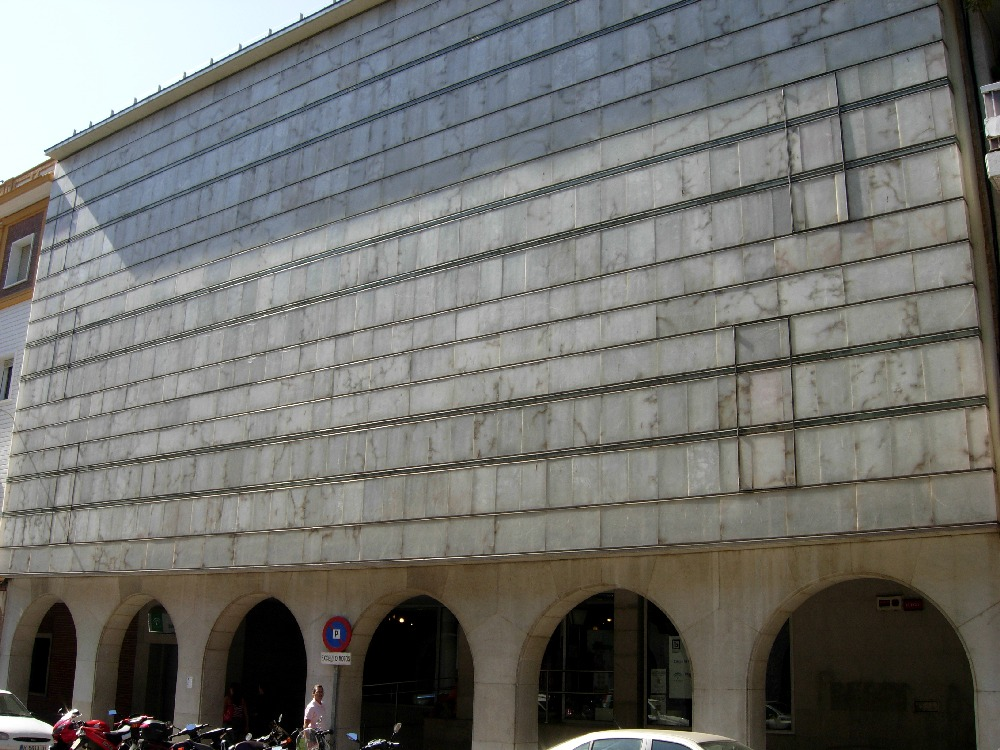
- 37.2556°N 6.9486°W
- Established: 1856

The Huelva Public Library is a public library located in Huelva, Spain.

== See also ==
- List of libraries in Spain
