= Granada Public Library =

Library in Spain

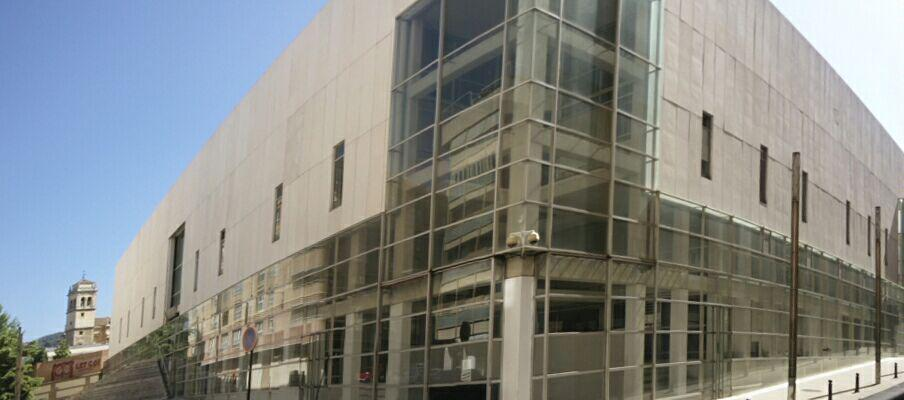
- 37°10′42″N 3°36′22″W
- Location: Granada, Spain
- Established: 1933

Other information
- Website: Official website

The Granada Public Library is a public library located in Granada, Spain.

== See also ==
- List of libraries in Spain
