= Málaga Public Library =

- Biblioteca de Málaga. Biblioteca Pública del Estado-Biblioteca Provincial de Málaga
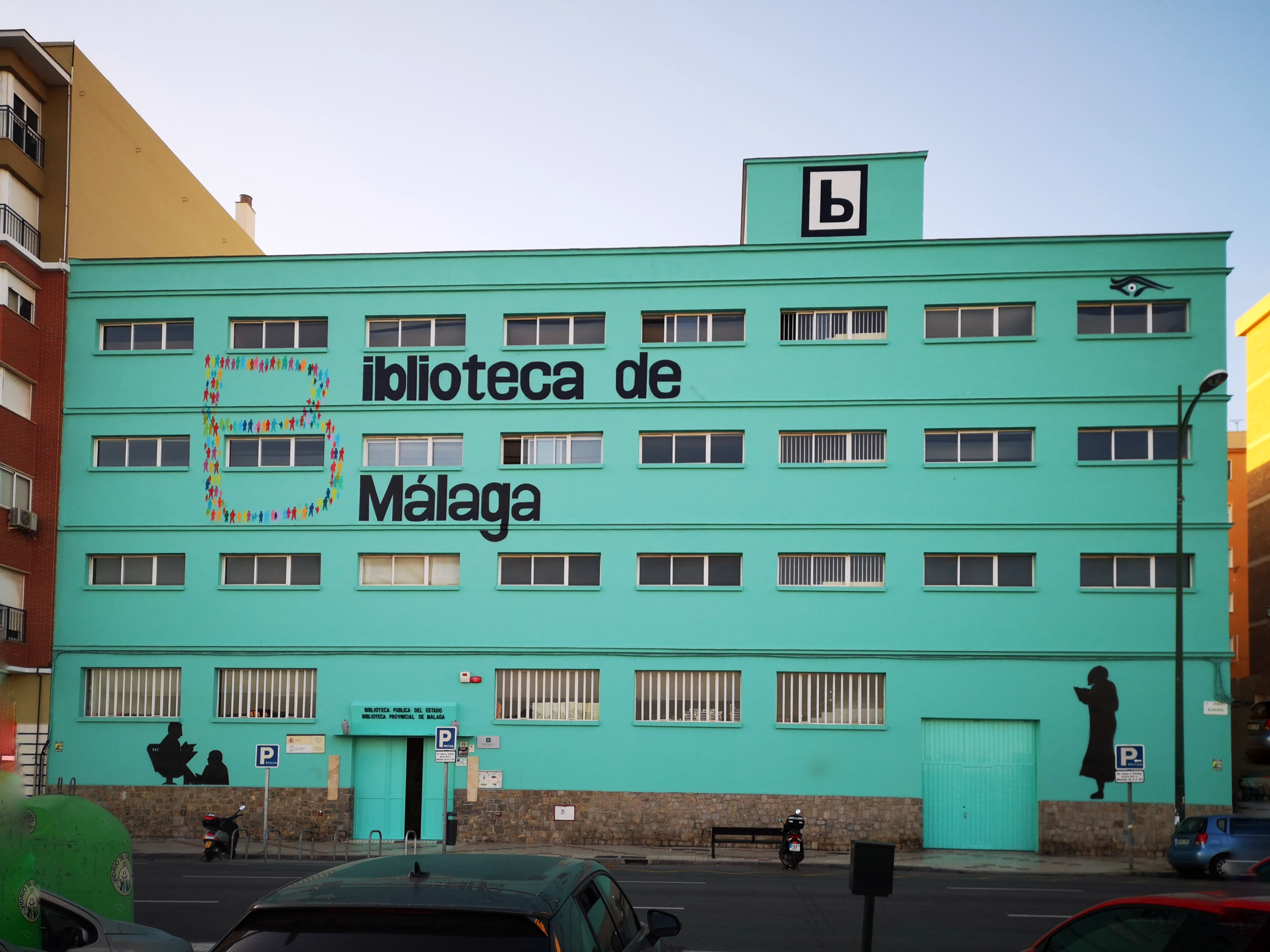
- 36°42′09″N 04°26′41″W
- Location: Málaga, Spain
- Type: public library
- Established: 1895

Other information
- Website: https://www.bibliotecasdeandalucia.es/web/biblioteca-del-estado-publica-provincial-de-malaga

The Málaga Public Library is a public library located in Málaga, Spain.

== See also ==
- List of libraries in Spain
