= Seville Public Library =

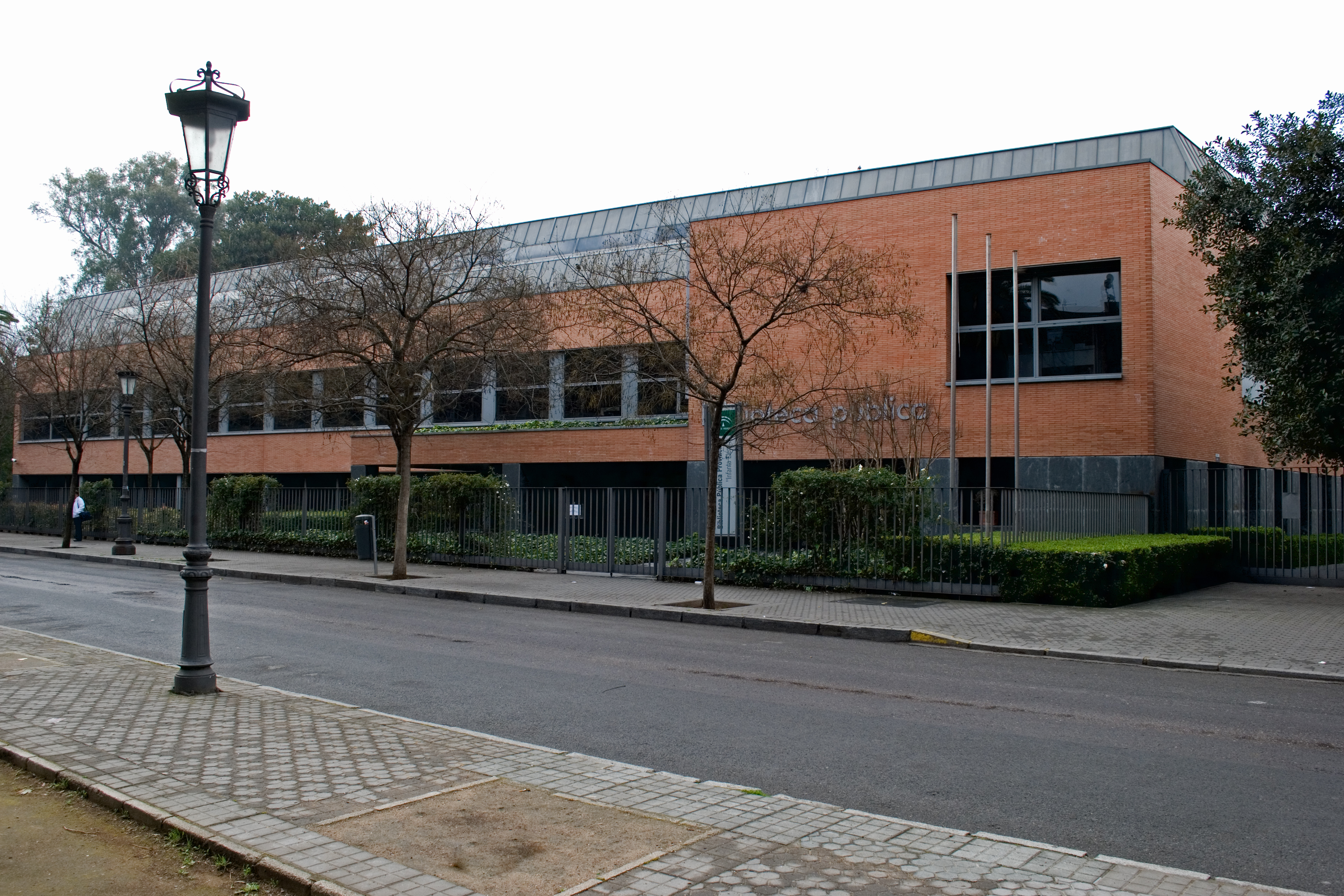
- Biblioteca Infanta Elena, Sevilla. Architects Cruz y Ortiz (1995-1999)

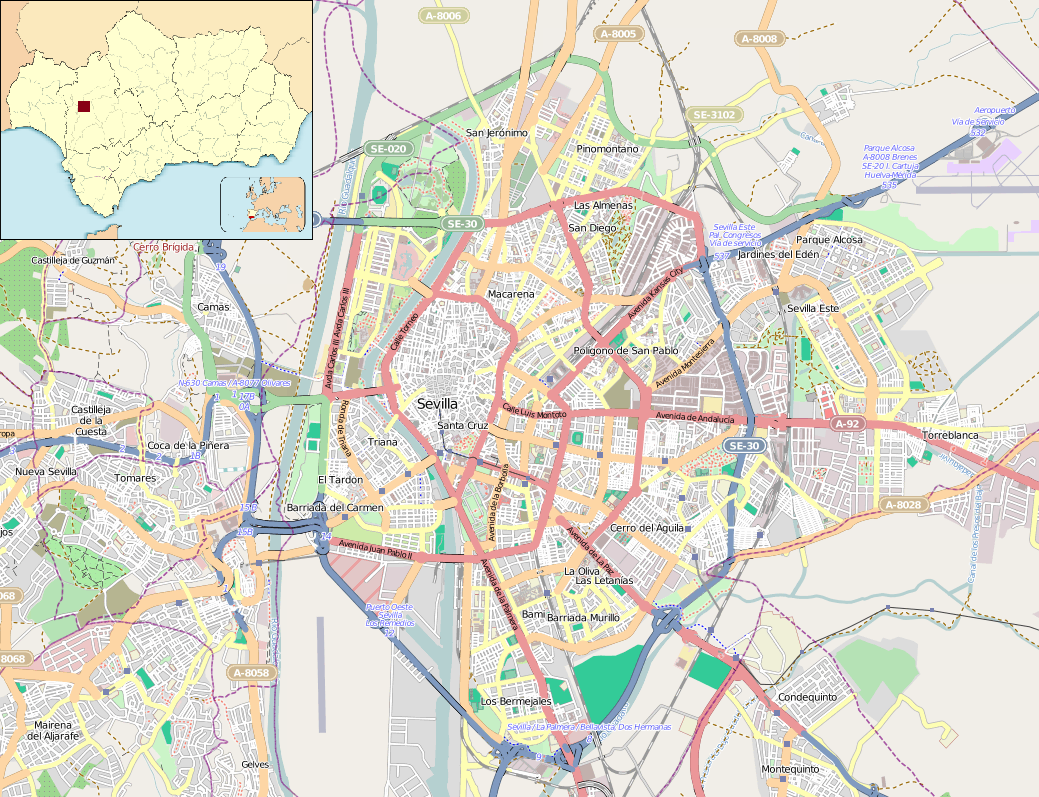
- Location within Seville

General information
- Location: Seville, Spain
- Coordinates: 37°22′36″N 5°59′30″W
- Inaugurated: 2 October 1959

Website
- La institución

The Seville Public Library (Biblioteca Pública del Estado - Biblioteca Provincial Infanta Elena de Sevilla) is a public library located in Seville, Spain. The library used to be founded in 1959 and occupied two different buildings before moving to its current location in the Maria Luisa Park. The new building opened in 1999 with 5,000 square metres (54,000 sq ft) of public space. With a highly innovative design, it has been nominated for a major European architectural award.

== History ==
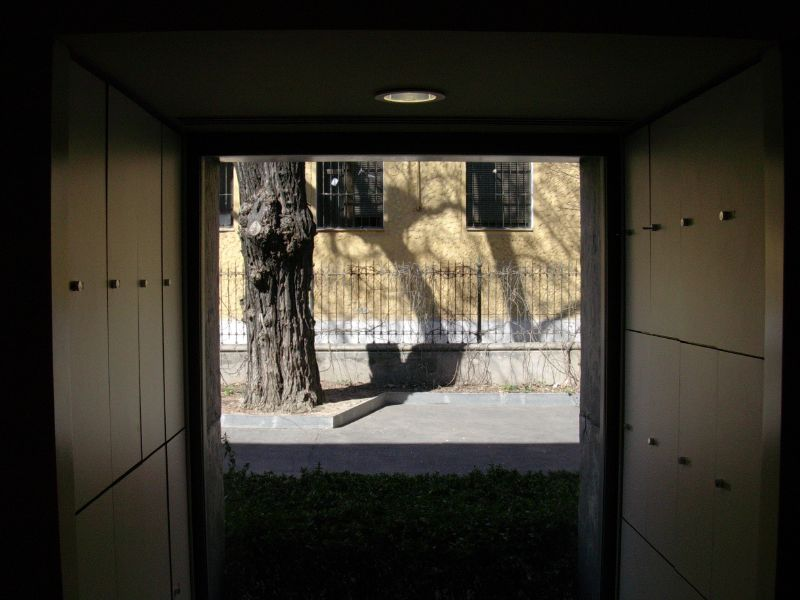

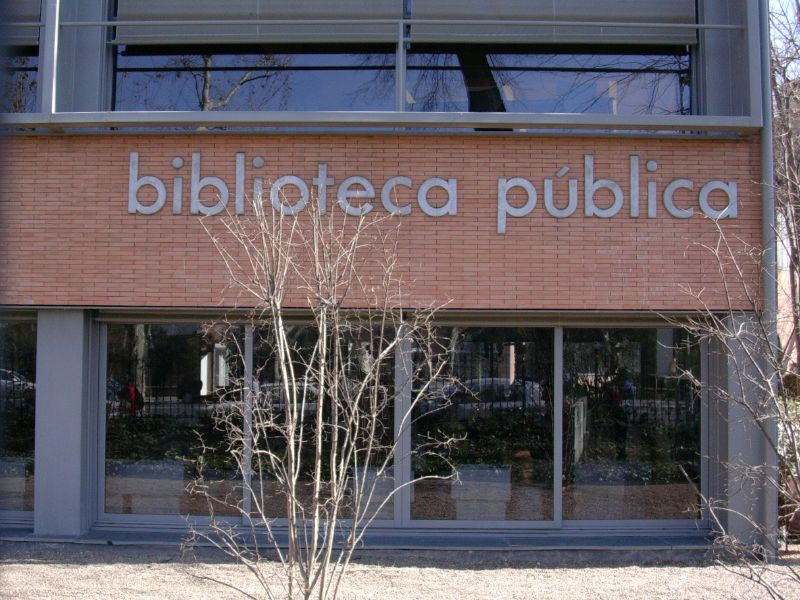

In 2011 Juan Muñoz Corn published La Historia de la Biblioteca Provincial de Sevilla, a history of the library from its inception in 1959 until 2009. The book was written by Juana Munoz, former director of the library. She describes the internal challenges and changes made to the library over the fifty-year period, and relates these to the related external events and social changes. The book was issued in a limited edition of 1,000 copies.

The library was opened on 2 October 1959, at first in premises provided by the Real Sociedad Económica de Amigos del Pais. For its opening it was given 15,000 volumes from the 18th and 19th centuries. The library moved in 1979 to a building at 19 calle Alfonso XII and was named the Biblioteca Pública Provincial de Sevilla (Provincial Public Library of Seville) for the next twenty years. It moved again in 1999 to its present location with the new name of Biblioteca Pública Provincial Infanta Elena de Sevilla (Princess Elena Provincial Public Library of Seville).

In its new location the library has attracted growing numbers of visitors, prompting the management to extend the hours that it is open, even in the summer. In addition to being used for reading and study, the library supports a variety of cultural activities throughout the year. These include film series aimed at young audiences, musical theater and concerts. Over 25,000 people visited the library in August 2002. From June to September 2011, however, the library was forced to close earlier due to the financial crisis. It would only be open from 9 am to 2 pm during this period. This drew complaints from students who had come to rely on the library as a place to study and from older people in the habit of reading the papers there in the afternoon or watching movies.

== Building ==
The current library building is located in the Parque de María Luisa. This was the site of the Ibero-American Exposition of 1929. It lies between the Pavilion of the United States and the Pavilion of Peru, which now holds the Science Center and the consulate of Peru. The architects Cruz y Ortiz were selected to undertake the project, which started in 1995. The building conforms to the shape of the site, with six sides in all. One of the sides faces the park while another faces the Guadalquivir River The building was inaugurated in 1999 by the Infanta Elena, Duchess of Lugo. It was nominated for the Mies van der Rohe Award for European Architecture in 2001.

The two-story building conceals an interior courtyard, invisible from outside, which provides a second source of natural light for the reading rooms. The courtyard itself can be used as an open-air reading room. The structure defines a C-shaped space with the rooms fully open to the interior façade. The two floors have a combined area of 5,000 square metres (54,000 sq ft). The building is built of exposed brick and black metalwork. The ground floor is almost entirely open to the outside, while the first floor is taller and has a denser appearance. This is where the exposed brick is used. The roof is made of zinc that slopes slightly inward to the courtyard.

== See also ==
- List of libraries in Spain
