= Cádiz Public Library =

Cádiz Provincial Library
- Biblioteca Provincial de Cádiz
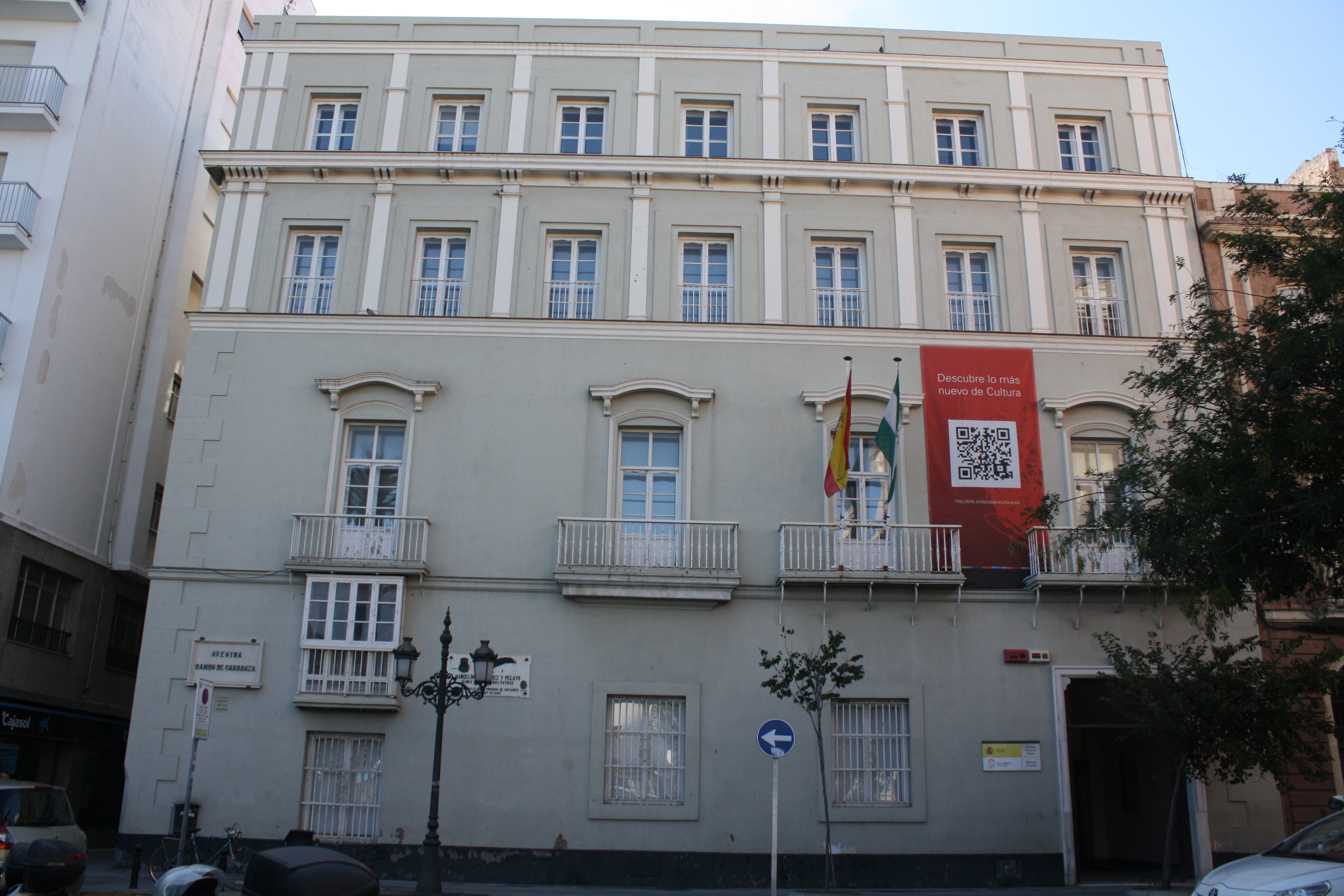
- 36.5337243160615°N 6.292895810385559°W
- Location: Cádiz, Spain
- Type: Public Library
- Established: 1851

Other information
- Website: www.juntadeandalucia.es/cultura/opencms/export/bibliotecas/bibcadiz/

The Cádiz Public Library is a public library located in Cádiz, Spain.

== See also ==
- List of libraries in Spain
