= Córdoba Public Library =

Public library in Córdoba, Spain

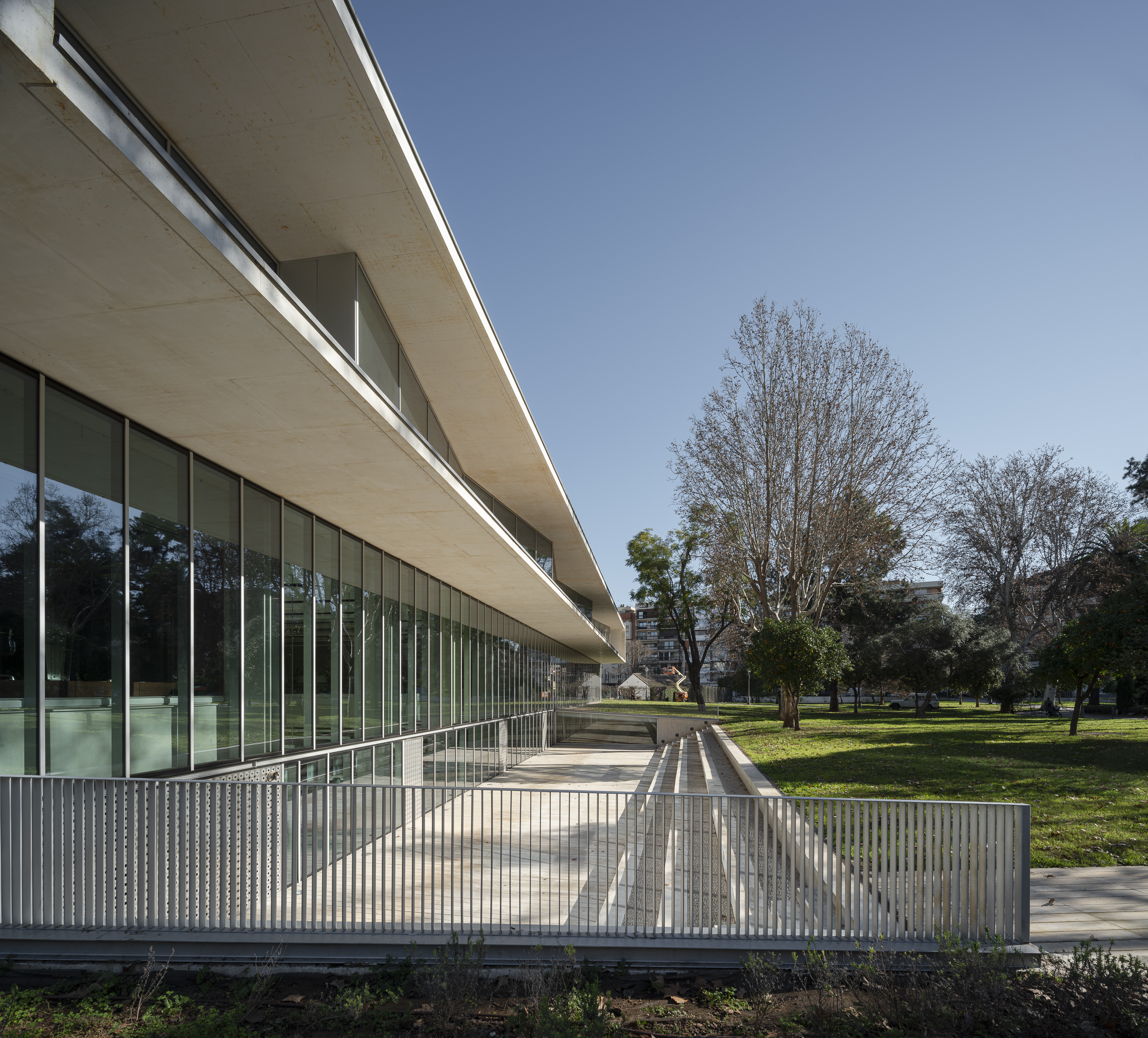
- 37°53′21″N 4°47′10″W
- Location: Córdoba, Spain
- Established: 1842

Other information
- Website: Official website

The Córdoba Public Library is a public library located in Córdoba, Spain. The Public Library of the State - Provincial Public Library of Córdoba is a center of state ownership managed by the Ministry of Culture of the Junta de Andalucía and integrated into the Andalusian System of Libraries and the Spanish Library System. In 1984, the Ministry of Culture transferred its management to the Junta de Andalucía, although the ownership of the buildings and bibliographic funds continue to belong to the State.

== History ==
Born under the protection of scientific commissions created to inventory and group all those funds belonging to the convents, monasteries and churches that were being dis entailed during the years 1835–1837. The Córdoba Public library was ordered to be created on July 12, 1842. Luis María Ramírez de las Casas - Deza would be responsible for inventorying funds.

== See also ==
- List of libraries in Spain
