= Public Library of Lleida =

Coordinates: 41.6134°N 0.620328°E

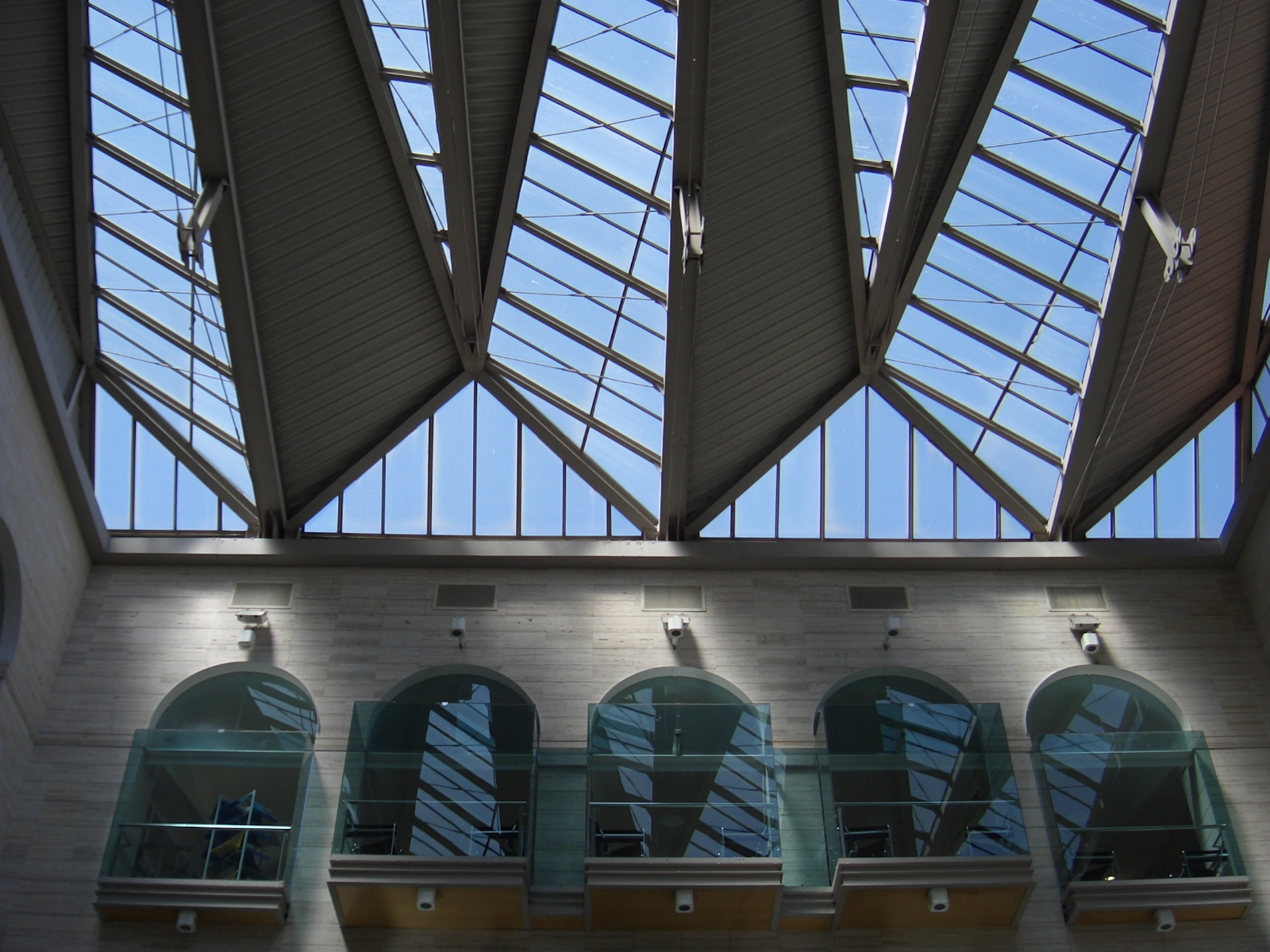
The roof.

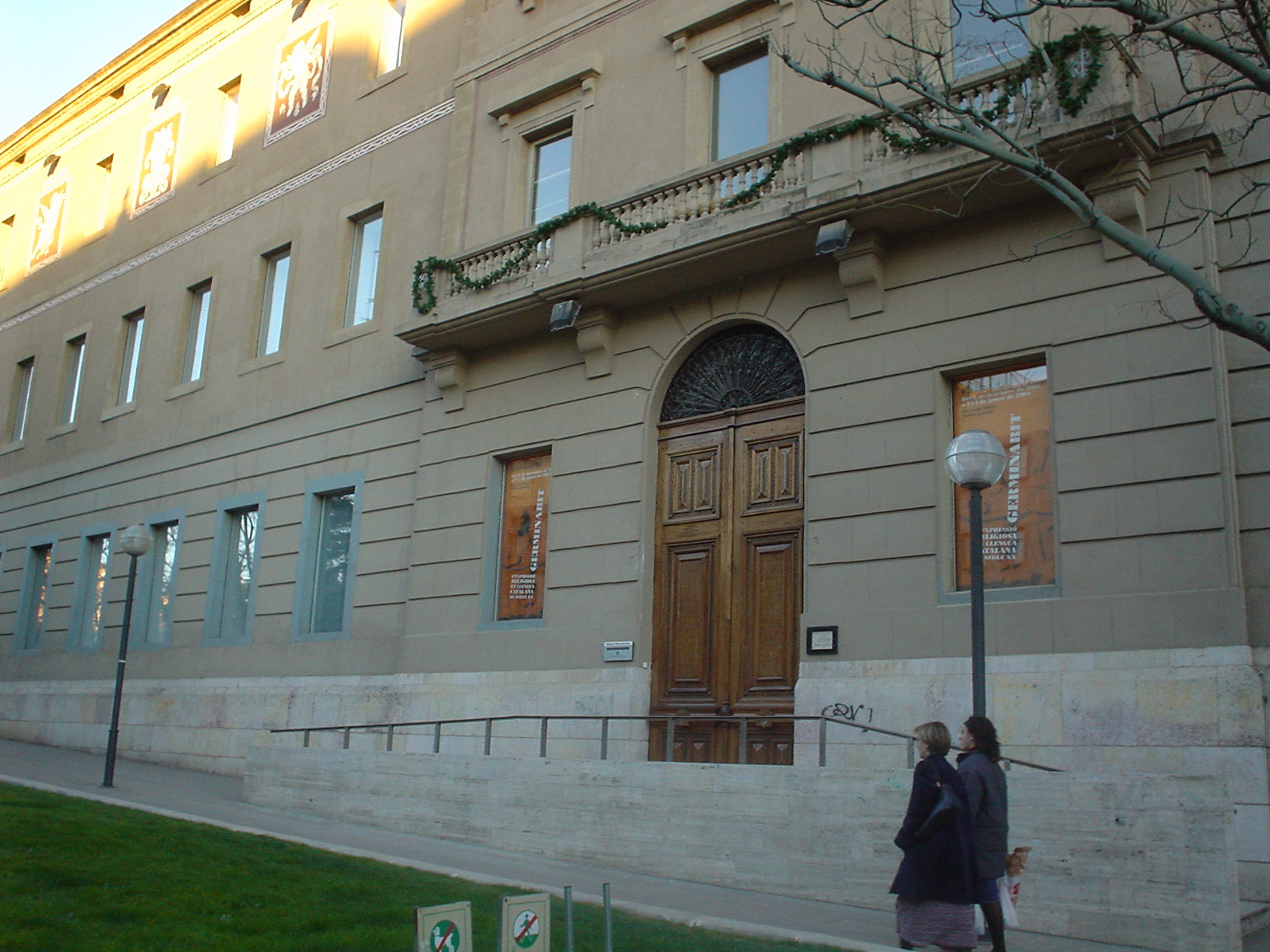
Main façade.

The Public Library of Lleida (Catalan: Biblioteca Pública de Lleida), also formerly called Biblioteca Pública de la Maternitat, is a public library in the city of Lleida (Catalonia, Spain). Its legal owner is the Generalitat de Catalunya. The building was originally a 19th-century maternity house, that is, an orphanage located in the Rambla d'Aragó and has operated as the town's main library since 1998, when it was heavily reformed.

It contains over 150,000 books and 9,760 printed documents from the 16th to the 19th century, 6 manuscripts, and 25 incunables. The library's two cloysters are often used for artistic and cultural exhibitions, often related to local artists or focusing on social issues, including one in 1998 on its own past as an orphanage.

== See also ==
- National Library of Catalonia
- Culture in Lleida
