= Public Library of Valencia =

Coordinates: 39°28′13″N 0°22′54″W

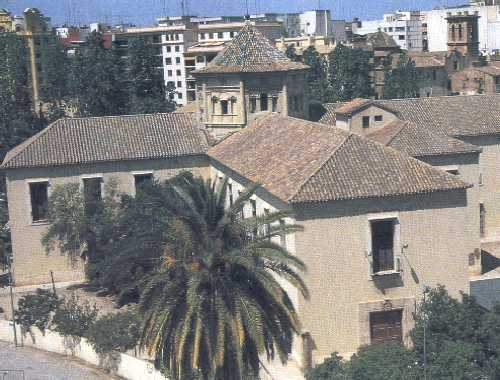
- Location: Valencia, Spain
- Established: 1979

Other information
- Director: Everilda Ferriols Segrelles

The Public Library of Valencia is the main library of the city of Valencia. As an institution, it was founded in 1838. However, it was not until 1979 when it was relocated to its present location, the main building of the former Hospital for the Poor Innocents.

== History ==
=== The building as a hospital ===
The building that currently houses the library was founded in 1409 by members of the Valencian bourgeoisie of the time, encouraged by a sermon of Fray Juan Gilabert Jofre in which he defended the need to create an institution to care of the mentally ill. That is how the Hospital de Folls de Santa María dels Pobres Innocents was founded. It was the first psychiatric hospital founded in Europe and in 1493 it was granted permission to expand the hospital. The construction works built a new nursing with the form of a Greek cross as one of the many attachments to the hospital, and in which now is located the library. It had two floors, the lower one designed to treat men, and the upper one, for women.

Until the early 16th century, in Valencia coexisted several minor hospitals, usually associated with religious organizations that were dedicated to cure specific diseases. In 1511, an edict of Ferdinand II of Aragon decreed the unification of all these hospitals into one. Some other attachments were added and the whole complex was renamed as General Hospital of Valencia. A fire in 1547 forced reconstruction of the building, and in 1664 a second transept was built. The Gothic portal which is currently in the entrance of the library is the only original piece that remains from before the fire.

=== The public library ===
As an institution, it was founded in 1838. The origin of the institution comes from 1938, and has its beginnings in the Popular Library of Valencia, originally placed in Casa Vestuario, in Plaza de la Virgen.

=== The building as a library ===
The health complex continued to serve as a hospital until 1960 when it opened the Clinical Hospital of Valencia. After the abandonment of the center began the demolition of the same. During that process, the church, the old pharmacy and the medical school were demolished. Nevertheless, the citizen opposition managed to stop the demolition just before the building of nursing was brought down. Nowadays, in that building is located the library.

On November 28, 1963, through Decree 3438, the buildings that had not been demolished were declared as a conjunto histórico (Historic-artistic ensemble), surviving to the construction works the old infirmary, the hermitage of Santa Lucia and the chapel known as "El Capitulet". In 1979, the Ministry of Culture installed the Public Library of Valencia in the former hospital building, and the Coordinating Center Library (now IVAJ) at the pharmacy.

Due to the form of Greek cross of the building, the library divides its services by wings: the entrance is in the public limelight and shelves of magazines and reference books; in the left wing, the loan service; on the right, the material for children and youth, and in the background, the service archive. Upstairs, there are the wings of humanities, science, the offices and the local fund.

== Services ==
As a centre, the Public Library of Valencia offers the following services:

- Bibliographic information
- Home loan of books and other media
- Cultural activities
- Check and reading rooms
- Online services (ILL, desiderata, reservations and renewals ...)
- Wifi and Internet

== Directors ==
Directors of the library
Director	Years
Pilar Faus	1979–1993
Carolina Sevilla	1993–2007
Rafael Coloma	2008–2010
María Jesús Carrillo	2010–2014
Everilda Ferriols Segrelles	2014–2016
Ana Moure	2016–Present

== Gallery of images ==
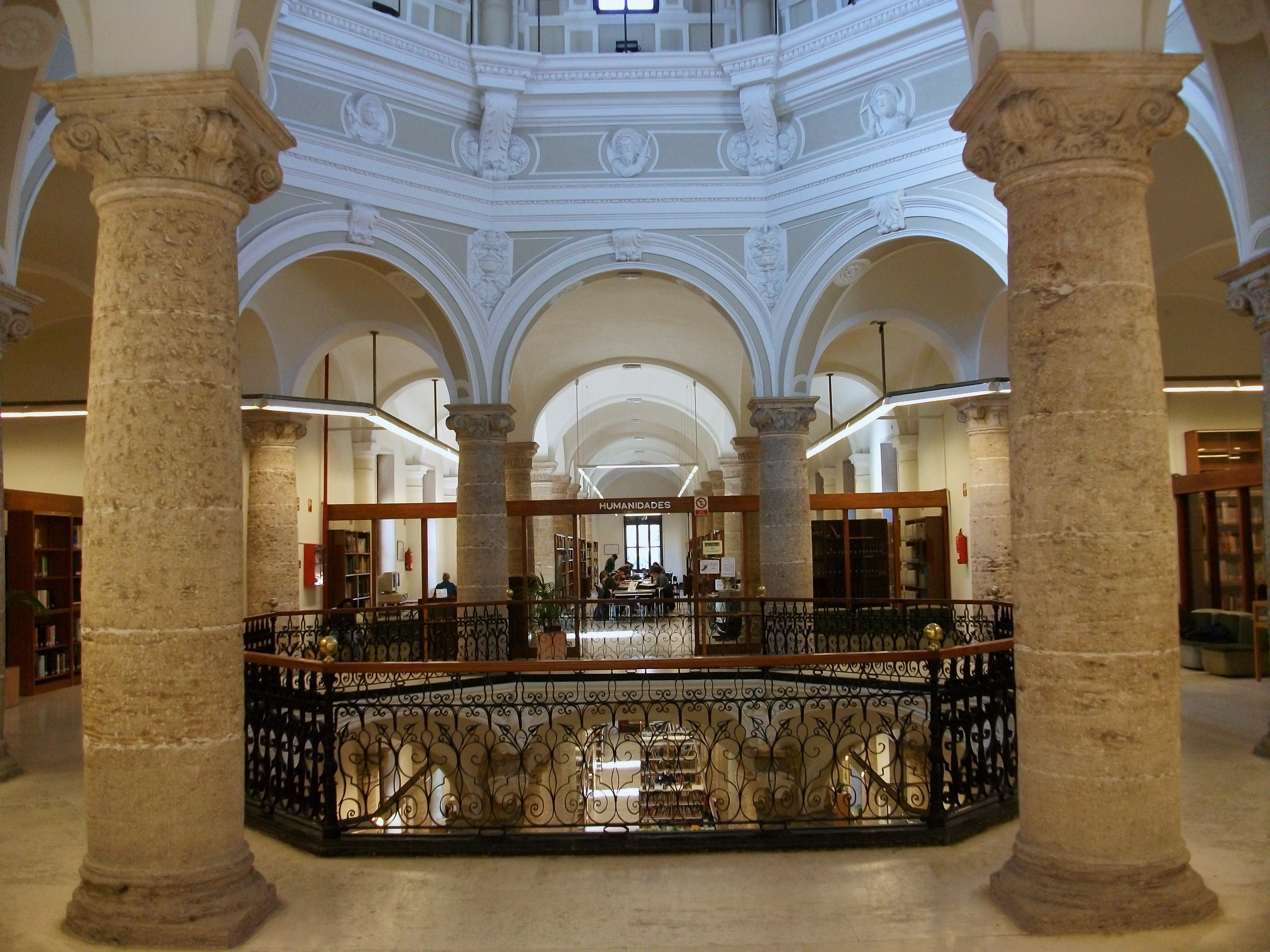
Intersection of the old General Hospital of Valencia, nowadays, Public Library of the city

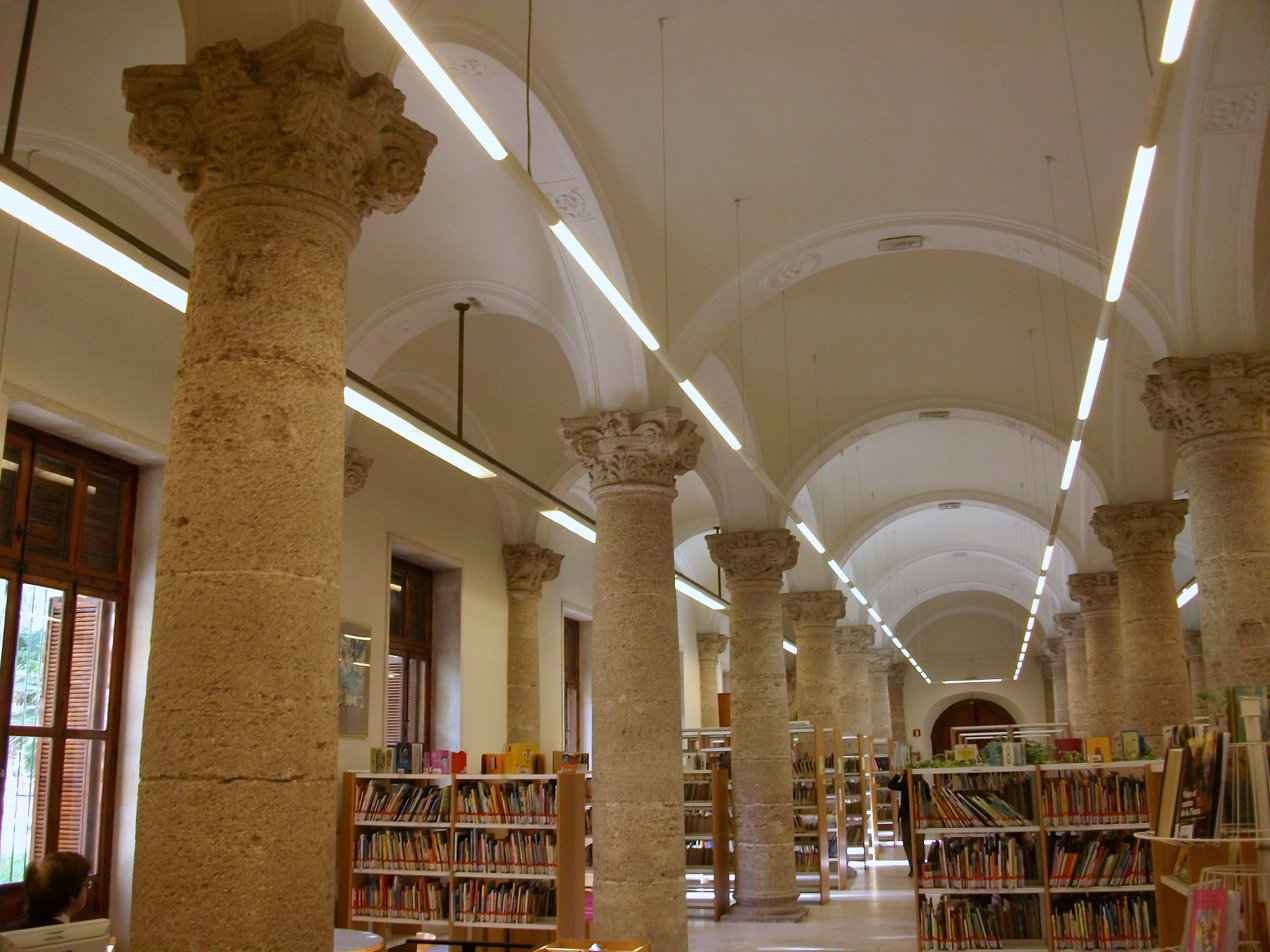
Central and lateral shed of the building

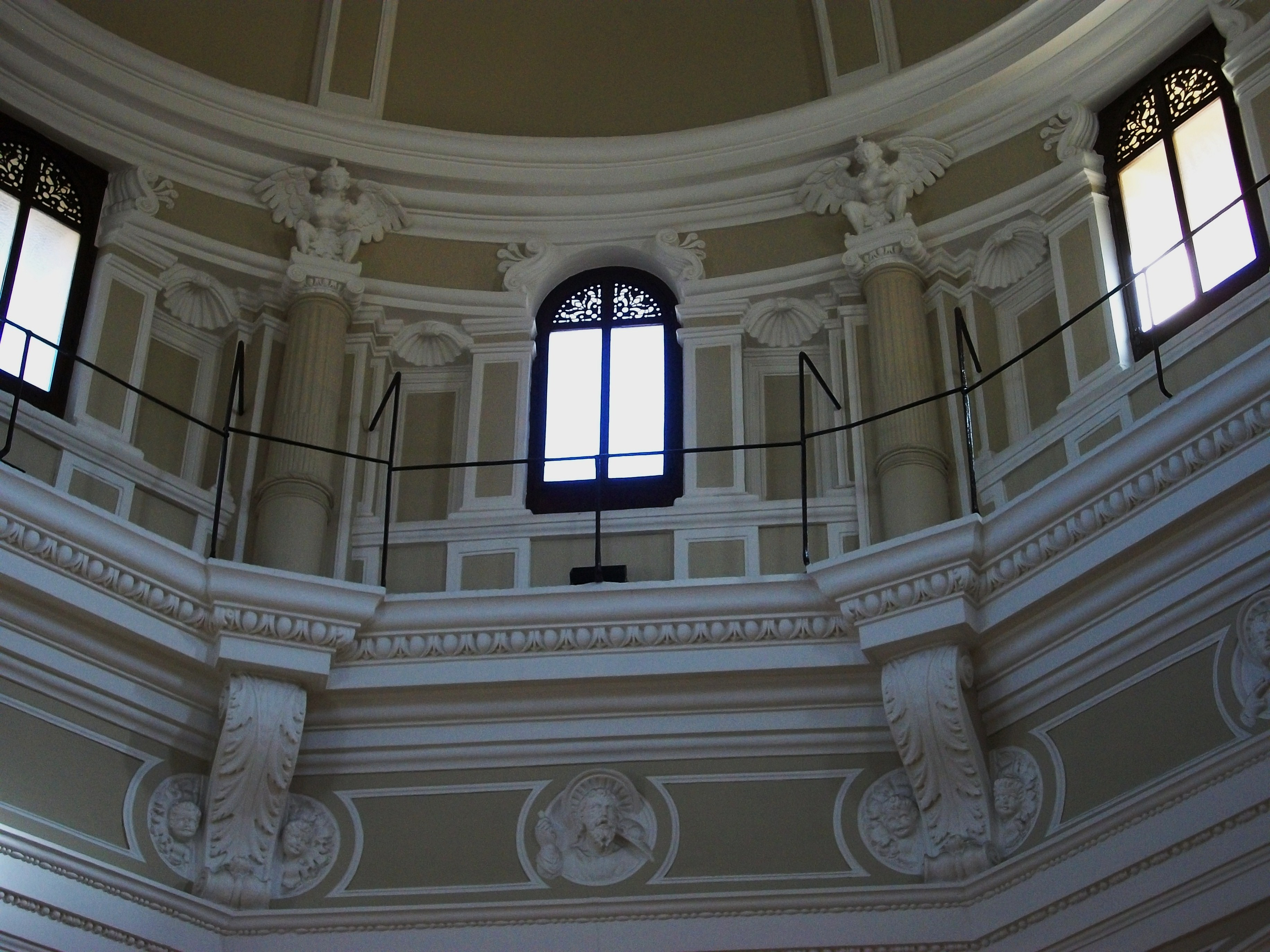
Details in the inner side of the dome

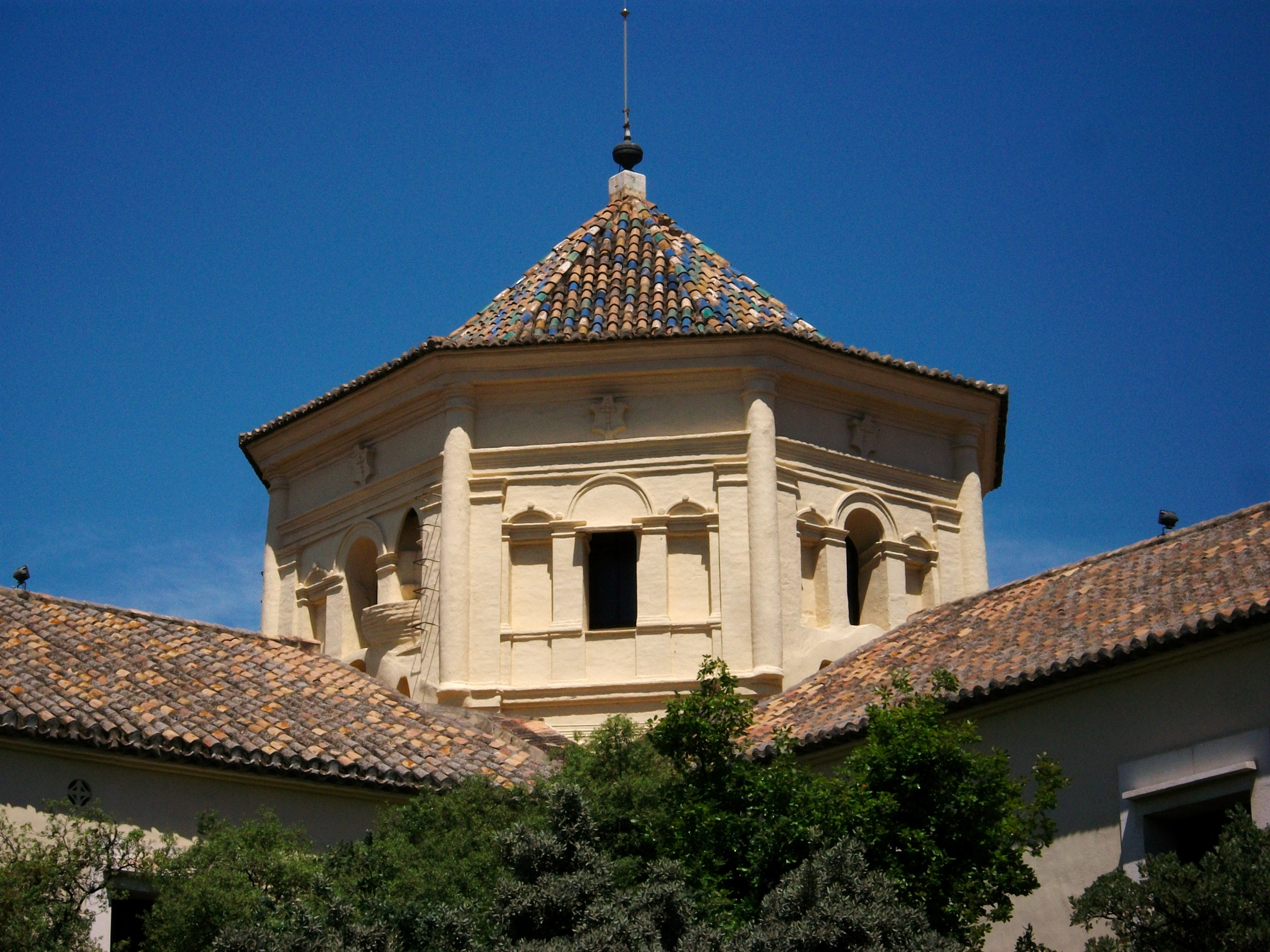
Details of the exterior side of the dome

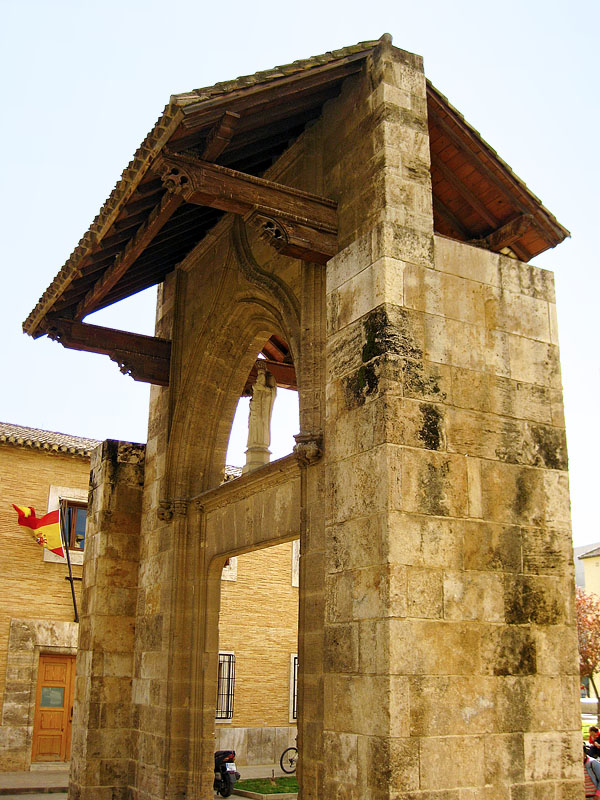
Gothic portal of the first building

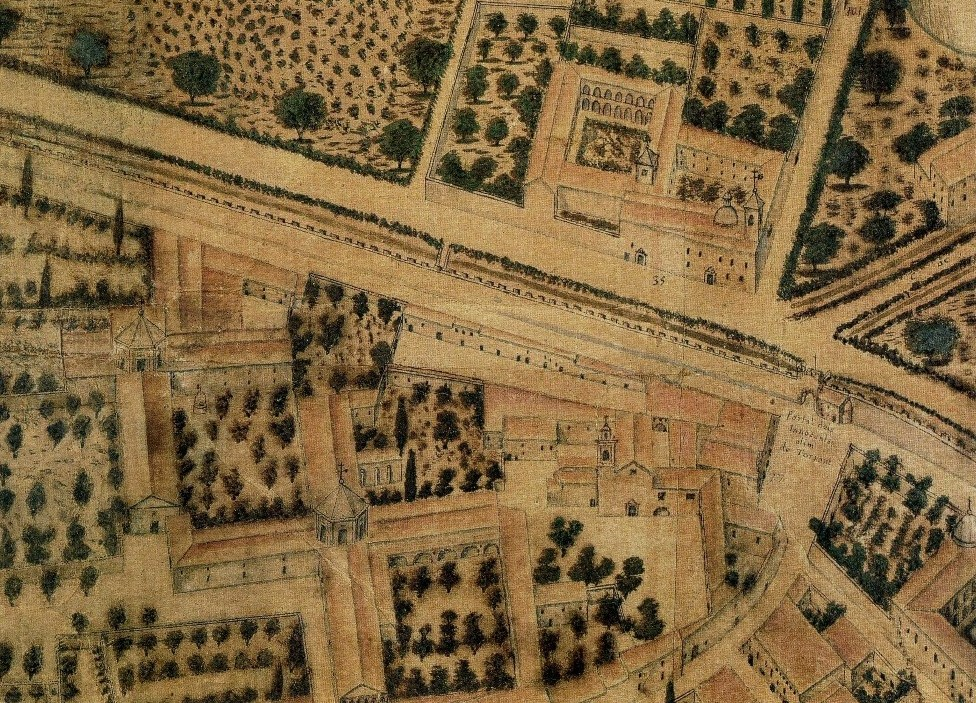
Map of the hospital, made by Pare Toca in 1704
