= Tello =

Tello may refer to:

== People ==
- Tello (bishop of Chur)
- Tello Pérez de Meneses
- Tello Téllez de Meneses
- Tello Alfonso, Lord of Aguilar de Campoo
- Tello (surname)

== Places ==
- Tello, Huila
- Tello, Cameroon
- Tell Telloh, the site of ancient Girsu

== Other uses ==
- Tello (dance)
- Tello Mobile
- Ryze Tello, drone made by Ryze with DJI technology

== See also ==
- Telo (disambiguation)
