= Telo =

Telo may refer to:

== People ==
- Christopher Telo (born 1989), English-born Swedish footballer
- Dominic Telo (born 1986), South African cricketer
- Jean Félix Demba Telo, Congolese politician
- João Afonso Telo (disambiguation)
- Maria Filomena de Fátima Lobão Telo Delgado, Angolan diplomat
- María Telo (1915–2014), Spanish jurist
- Mario Telò (1950–2023), Italian political scientist
- Martim Afonso Telo de Meneses (died 1356), Portuguese noble
- Michel Teló (born 1981), Brazilian sertanejo singer-songwriter and actor
- Telo Mascarenhas (1899–1979), Indian writer
- Telo T. Taitague, Guamian politician
- Telo Tulku (born 1972), a Tibetan rimpoche

== Places ==
- Telo (woreda), one of the woredas (districts) in the Southern Nations, Nationalities, and Peoples' Region of Ethiopia
- Telo, Bokaro, a census town in Jharkhand, India

== Groups, organizations ==
- Tamil Eelam Liberation Organization
- Telo Trucks, a Californian EV start-up aiming to produce a small electric pickup truck

== Others ==
- Telo (mythology), a Celtic god, the eponymous spirit of Toulon in the Var
- Ooma Telo, a VoIP telephone and service

== See also ==
- Telo mimetico, a military camouflage pattern used by the Italian Army for shelter-halves
- Tilos (also spelled Telos), a Greek Aegean island
- Tela (disambiguation)
- Telos (disambiguation)
- Tello (disambiguation)
