= Tuition fees in Spain =

Amount that a student must pay to be able to pursue higher education in Spain

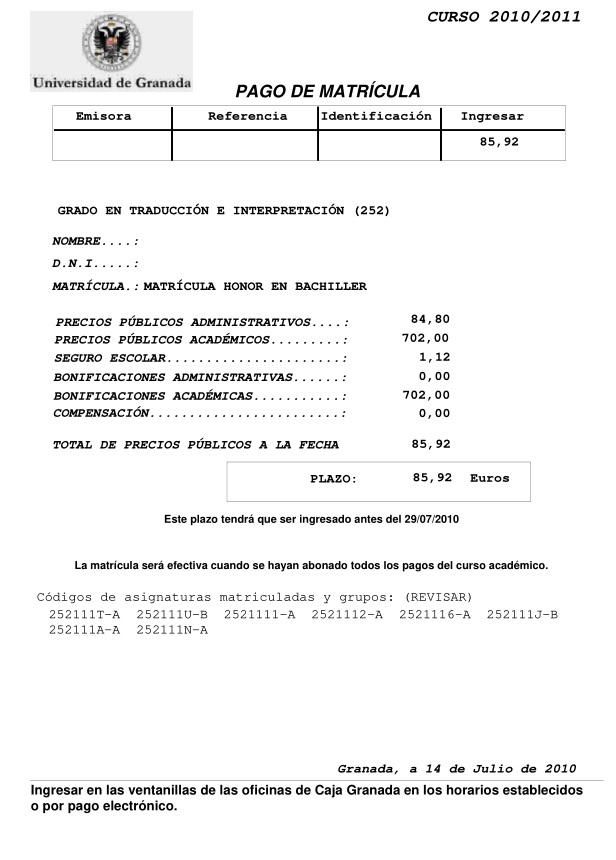
Example of a payment letter for an bachelor's degree matriculation at the University of Granada. The student obtained a reduction thanks to having received an Honours

Tuition fees in Spain correspond to the amount of money that a student must pay in order to pursue higher education studies in Spain. Although they are generally associated with the cost of matriculation (matriculation fees), they may also include other payments, such as enrollment in assessment tests or the issuance of official academic and administrative documents. In the case of fees at public universities, these are called "academic public prices". In turn, private universities can adjust their own prices because they have a financing system that is independent from the government, resulting in substantially higher tuition fees.

== Overview ==
In Spain, public universities fees are established annually by laws enacted by the governments of each autonomous community, following a series of basic criteria dictated by the central government and published in the Official State Gazette (Spanish: Boletín Oficial del Estado, BOE). This means that fees can vary widely depending on the community in question. For example, for the 2021–2022 academic year, the highest were in the Community of Madrid and Catalonia, with an average price per credit at €23.4 and €23.1 respectively; while the lowest were in Galicia, with €11.9 per credit. The average price in Spain for a full matriculation bachelor's degree for the year 2022 is 1,044 euros.

Proportionally, most of the cost of studies at public universities in Spain is borne by the state, with the student contributing approximately 25% of the total cost, a figure that varies from one autonomous community to another. However, this payment can reach up to 100% of the actual cost when it comes to foreign students without the status of residents, excluding those from member states of the European Union.

Within the public university sector, the only fees set directly by the central government through the BOE and not by the autonomous communities are those of the National University of Distance Education (Spanish: Universidad Nacional de Educación a Distancia, UNED).

Those students who receive a general scholarship from the Spanish state are exempt from payment. In recent decades, approximately 20 to 30% of students at public universities in Spain receive a scholarship of this type linked to an economic attribution, but which includes, in any case, exemption from matriculation fees. The number of people receiving this aid is substantially lower when it comes to master's degree students. About half of all bachelor's degree students receive it in some year of their studies.

== History ==
=== Middle ages ===
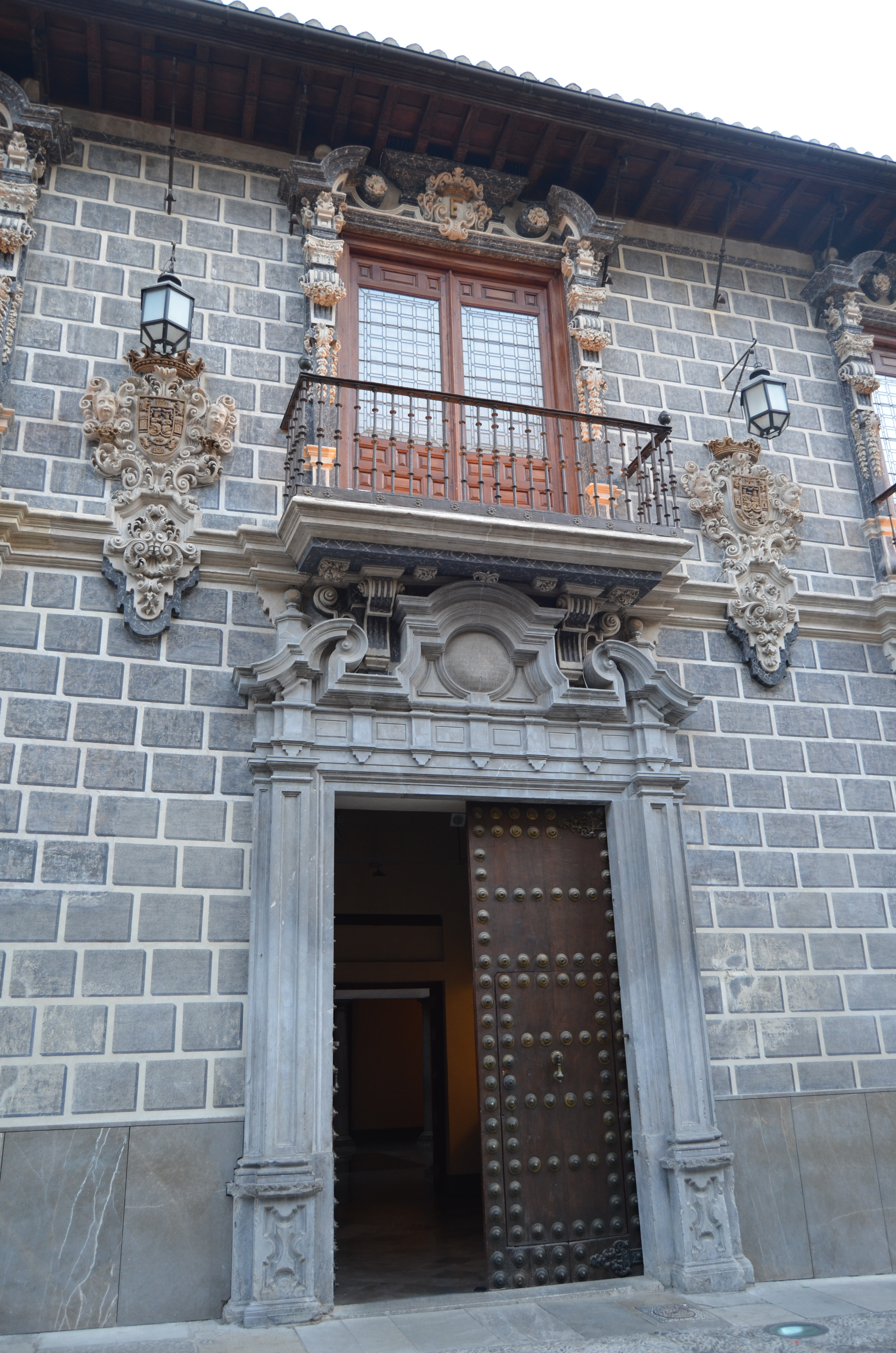
Facade of the Madrasa of Granada, considered the most important institution of higher education in Al-Andalus

The first academic institutions to appear on the peninsula in the Middle Ages were the Islamic schools, whose main representative was the Madrasa of Granada. The first catholic institutions founded in the Spain of the reconquest would emerge later on, such as the University of Palencia and the University of Salamanca.

Establishing what was the payment regime for the student in the Islamic madrasahs is complex because of the scarcity of detailed data. The educational institutions of Al-Andalus lacked centralization, and their economic management was probably independent, but it is plausible that these were free admission or, in any case, individualized.

As for the Catholic centers, the predominant hypothesis describes a university education most probably free of charge, following the tradition of the cathedral and monastic schools that strongly defended the idea that knowledge "is a gift of God and therefore should not be sold". Demanding money for education could therefore be considered simony, which forced the institutions to look for other ways of financing. In their beginnings, the universities of royal foundation received it, in great part, from the king himself, who even donated properties or buildings of the crown. Later, due to the insufficient and irregular distribution of these endowments, ecclesiastical support was required, which was requested through a petition to the pope by the king or the university itself. Likewise, some received financing from the public treasury of the city in which they were located, as in the case of the University of Lleida.

Towards the end of the Middle Ages, the precursors of fees as they are conceived today began to be introduced: payments for matriculation fees and the granting of degrees. However, these were probably very low in amount, and at no time were they of sufficient importance to solve the frequent financial problems of the institutions of the time.

=== Early modern age ===
Texts describing the finances and different economic structures of university institutions in the early modern age are scarce and vary significantly depending on the center in question. Out of these, the most detailed information is the one that describes the economic situation of the universities of Salamanca, Valladolid and Alcalá.

Revenues of the universities of the time are closely linked to the production surpluses of the agrarian environment in which they are located, and they were often financed through the ecclesiastical tithe of their dioceses. By mid-16th century, the income derived from this tax generally represented an amount somewhat higher than 90% of university income, a percentage that would remain between 70% and 90% until the 18th century. The equivalent of the concept of "tax", as it is conceived today, is reflected as "payments for secretarial fees, matriculation and degrees", but this represents a very small percentage of total income in modern times: for example, this was 1.9% for the University of Valladolid in the years 1770–1779, and never exceeded 1.8% of the overall totals for the University of Salamanca between the 16th and 18th centuries.

It was not until 1845 when, through the implementation of the Pidal Plan, precursor of the Moyano Law, an attempt was made to give more prominence to tuition fees in the finances of these institutions.

=== Mid-19th century to the Franco regime ===
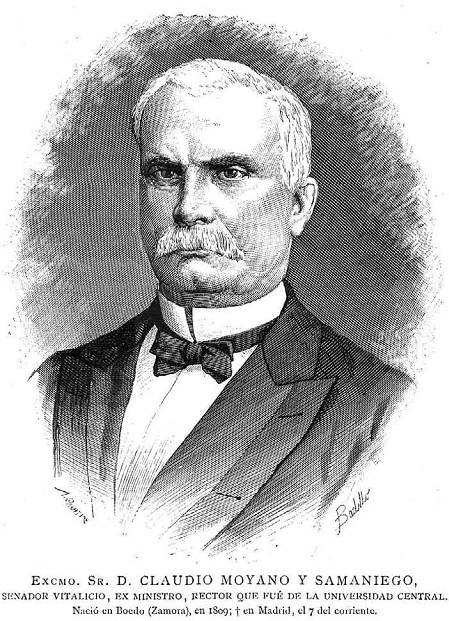
Portrait of Claudio Moyano

The Law of Public Instruction of September 9, 1857, also popularly known as the "Moyano Law", distinguished three types of fees: enrollment fees, required of students in the different educational centers; fees for degrees and titles, represented by payments to be made for obtaining academic degrees and titles in higher and professional careers; and professional certificates that fulfilled the function of qualifying for professional practice. In addition, there were payments for "examination fees", established by this law in the amount of 20 reales and destined to a greater extent to pay the salaries of the professors. The specific prices to be paid were stipulated in the section " matriculation fees, degrees, diplomas and professional certificates" located at the end of the publication.

The amount to be paid to obtain academic degrees was a significantly high expense for the average salary of the time: for example, it was 5,000 reales for the degree of licenciado or doctor. An analysis of the Moyano Law states that the fees at the time were "really high, to the extent that they practically covered the [total] cost of education to the State".

The year 1900 saw the introduction of fees for practical subjects, which consisted of academic fees aimed at defraying the cost of teaching these types of classes, which required smaller attendance groups and were therefore more costly for the institutions.

=== Tuition fees during the Franco regime ===
==== Spanish University Organization Act ====
In 1943, the Ministry of National Education drafted the Spanish University Organization Act of July 29, which would regulate the existence of "a system of fees of different types, in relation to the economic possibilities of the student". This subject was addressed in Article 36, which established the creation of the School Protection Service, a body in charge of, among other things, "Fixing the school fees to be paid by each student". In addition, later, in article 86, "the general fees, which shall be reduced or even abolished, taking into account the intellectual and moral endowments of the pupils and the duly accredited financial means of their parents".

In theory, the fee payment system was individualized, but its concrete definition was in a certain legal limbo. This was largely decided by the rector, a figure appointed unilaterally by the government, which implied the existence of a certain variability in the price of matriculation at each Spanish university. A Bill issued by the Ministry in 1944 declared the matriculation fee to be 60 pesetas for each subject; and from 75 to 150 pesetas for the payment of the internship fee, which varied according to the course of study. In addition, free matriculation was guaranteed to students who, for economic reasons, needed it, but this was limited to 10% of the total number of students enrolled.

As a reference, according to the official budgets of the University of Madrid, in 1945, it earned a total of 3,164,500 pesetas. Considering that the number of students enrolled in that university for that year was around 6000–7000, we can establish that each one of them paid between 500 and 700 pesetas on average for a complete course, an amount that varied according to the degree course taken and according to the amount of aid they received if they were eligible for that option.

In 1959, Decree 639/1959 of September 26, on the validation of the fee for the issuance of academic, teaching and professional degrees, certifications and diplomas, was issued. The signing of this decree highlights the fall of the academic fees in the legal limbo mentioned above and the existence of a parafiscality of the same. The decree not only fails to solve these problems, but also leads to a general increase in the amount of these fees.

==== 1970 General Education Act ====
Subsequently, in 1970, the last educational reform law of the Franco dictatorship was passed: the General Education Act. Article 7.1 of this law specified restrictions on the cost of tuition fees:

In educational levels that are not free of charge, the fees of the State Centers shall not exceed the actual costs per school place. Within these limits, the Government shall fix their amount, which may be diversified according to criteria that weigh the performance of students and their economic situation.

This did not have an immediate repercussion on the fees, which remained stable between 1964 and 1976. It was in the latter when Decree 1888/1976, of July 30, 1976, was enacted, designed for the 1976–1977 academic year. The approval of the decree meant, in practice, an increase of approximately 300% in the average matriculation fee.

=== 1983-2001 ===
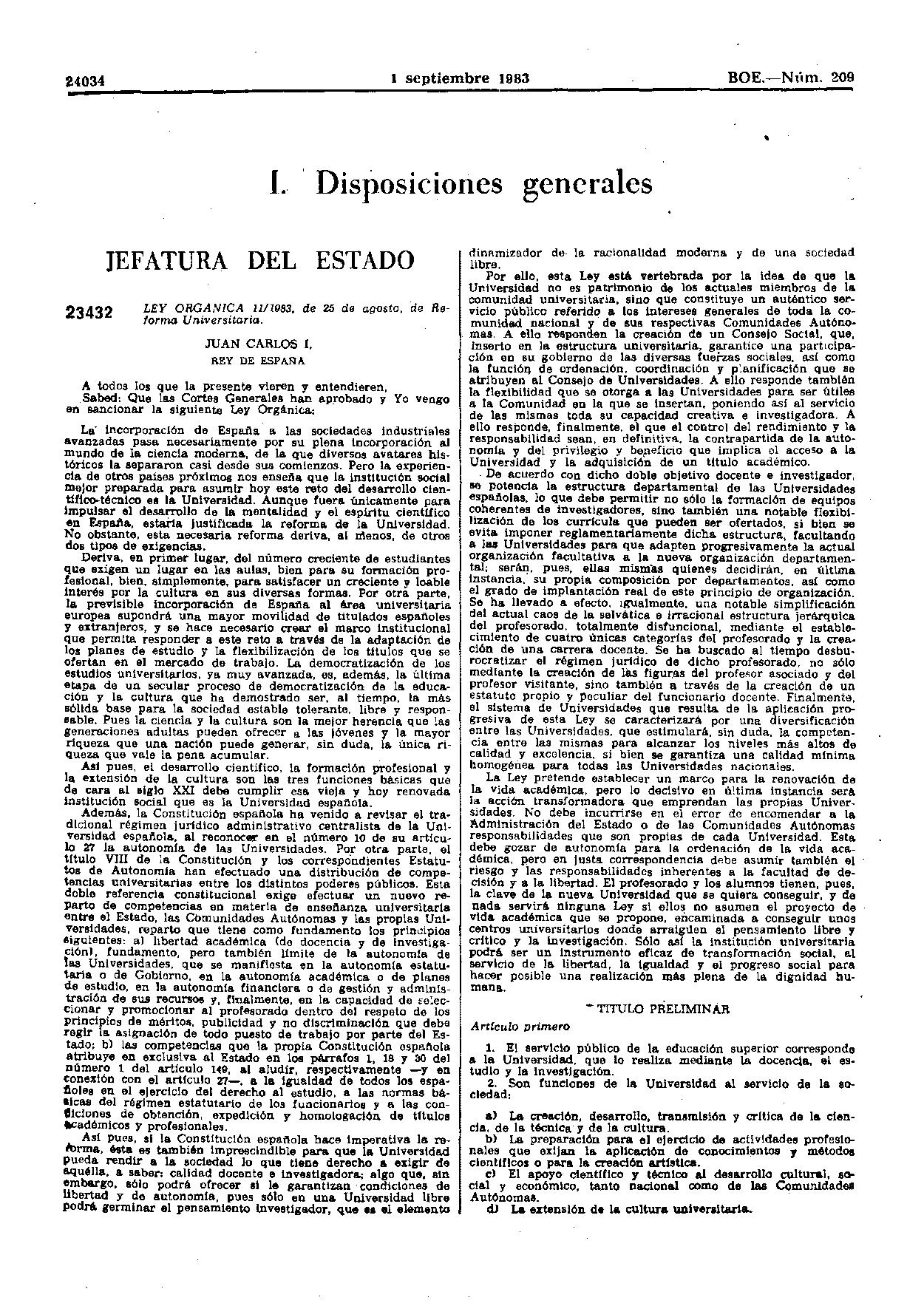
First page of Organic Law 11/1983, of August 25, 1983, on University Reform

In 1983, the Organic Law 11/1983, of August 25, 1983 on University Reform (Spanish: Ley de Reforma Universitaria, LRU) was passed.

According to this law, public universities would be governed by a new legal-administrative system. Under the LRU, it would be established that public prices for studies involving the issuance of official degrees were to be set by the general state administration, within the limits established by the Council of Universities. This regime of public prices established by the State would only be applied in the so-called "Autonomous Communities of MEC territory", composed of Aragón, Asturias, Balearic Islands, Cantabria, Castilla-La Mancha, Castile and León, Extremadura, Madrid, Murcia and La Rioja. The rest of the communities had already assumed powers in higher education, which allowed them to modify public prices.

Subsequently, Law 8/1989, of April 13, 1989, on Public Fees and Prices, which grants the status of "public prices" to matriculation fees, states that these must be set by Ministerial Order. It also introduced the distinction between "experimental" (which included most of the science degrees) and "non-experimental" (to which the rest belonged), which would be maintained until the 1991–1992 academic year.

In 1992, under the so-called "Model 92", the model of classification of studies between experimental and non-experimental studies was expanded to distinguish up to seven degrees of experimentality according to the branch of knowledge to which they belonged. This would also affect the amount to be paid according to each degree.

The progressive transfer of powers in education to the autonomous communities culminated in 1997, with the Balearic Islands being the last community to acquire them. This marked a turning point, since the transfer of competences resulted in a significant trend towards higher matriculation fees.

=== Organic Law 6/2001 and Bologna plan ===
Organic Law 6/2001, of December 21, 2001, on Universities, known simply as "LOU", introduced a wide-ranging reform that would affect all aspects of the Spanish university. With regard to public prices, it meant the consolidation of the administration of the autonomies of the same, by granting them significant economic independence. This was set out in Article 81. 3 (b):

b) Revenues from public prices for academic services and other legally established fees. In the case of studies leading to official degrees valid throughout the national territory, the public prices and fees shall be set by the Autonomous Community, within the limits established by the University Coordination Council, which shall be related to the costs of providing the service.

In the context of the signing of the Bologna Declaration of 1999, signed by the Ministers of Education of the 29 European countries, and the adaptation of the Spanish educational system to the common margins of the European Higher Education Area (EHEA), in a process known as the "Bologna Process", a transitional fee modification system was introduced in 2007, with the implementation of degrees adapted to the EHEA, which was carried out progressively throughout Spain, giving rise to the establishment of public prices per ECTS credit. Generally speaking, the adoption of this system meant a break with the price structure in force to date and a rise in the cost of credit.

=== Royal Decree-Law 14/2012 ===
In 2012 and in the context of the economic crisis resulting from the Great Recession of 2008, the Popular Party government approved Royal Decree 14/2012, which included "urgent measures to rationalize public spending in the field of education". The law, promoted by the former Minister of Education, Culture and Sport, José Ignacio Wert, allowed the communities to increase the price of tuition fees by up to 25% above the real cost with the aim, according to the government, of compensating for the reduction in funding in public centers.

In addition, the decree added a system of fixed brackets (different from the system of variable brackets linked to the CPI used to date) to public prices in proportion to actual costs according to the number of student enrollments for a specific subject:

1.° Undergraduate studies: public prices will cover between 15% and 25% of the costs for first enrollment; between 30% and 40% of the costs for second enrollment; between 65% and 75% of the costs for third enrollment; and between 90% and 100% of the costs from the fourth enrollment onwards.

2.° Master's Degrees that enable students to engage in regulated professional activities in Spain: public prices will cover between 15% and 25% of the costs for the first registration; between 30% and 40% of the costs for the second registration; between 65% and 75% of the costs for the third registration; and between 90% and 100% of the costs from the fourth registration onwards.

3.° Master's Degrees not included in the previous number: public prices will cover between 40% and 50% of the costs for the first enrollment; and between 65% and 75% of the costs from the second enrollment onwards.

Public prices may cover up to 100% of the costs of undergraduate and master's degree courses for foreign students over eighteen years of age who do not have the status of residents, excluding nationals of European Union Member States and those to whom the Community regime applies, without prejudice to the principle of reciprocity.

The different brackets would be subsequently modified in the General State Budget Laws of 2017 and 2018.

In practice, the application of this law meant a 17% increase in the average price of bachelor's degree matriculation between 2012 and 2019.

=== Royal Decree-Law 17/2020 (support to the cultural sector COVID-19) ===
On May 5, 2020, and in the context of the crisis caused by COVID-19, the coalition government between PSOE and Unidas Podemos introduced a package of measures to support the cultural sector, which included modifications to the public price regulation system.

This decree, in its seventh final provision, eliminates the system of brackets established by Wert in 2012, citing that this had entailed "not only an increase in [fees] in general terms, but also a notable increase in the disparity in said prices depending on the Autonomous Community where said service is provided, seriously affecting access to public university education and the principle of equal rights and duties of Spaniards."

== Public university fees today ==
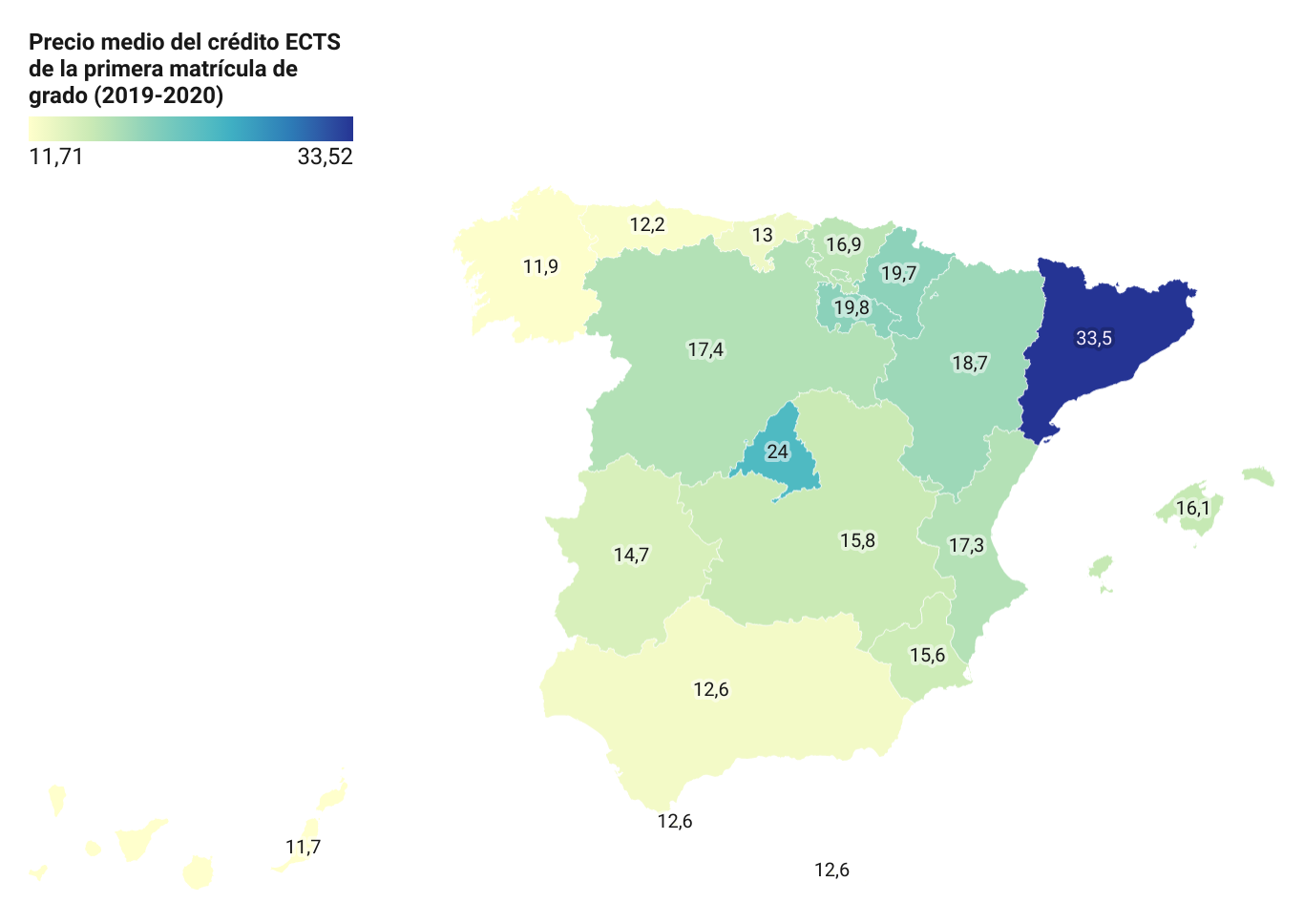
ECTS credit price map in euros for each autonomous community (year 2019–2020). Average price for the first bachelor's degree enrollment in euros. (Note: The map shows the price for the autonomous cities of Melilla and Ceuta. However, this is shown as the same as the price in Andalusia, since both campuses belong to the University of Granada and, therefore, follow the same public pricing policy.)

Section b) of Article 81.3 of Organic Law 6/2001, of December 21, 2001, on Universities establishes that "in the case of studies leading to the award of degrees of an official nature and valid throughout the national territory, public prices and fees shall be set by the Autonomous Community, within the maximum limits established by the General Conference on University Policy".

For practical purposes, this implies that public prices are largely determined by the governments of each autonomous community. In this sense, the central government has historically acted as a price stabilizer.

Generally speaking, and following the global trend in this regard, the price of a first university matriculation is usually lower than that of the second, third or fourth enrollment. In addition, there is often a significant variation in the price of different degrees depending on the academic discipline to which they belong. Thus, enrollments in the humanities tend to have the lowest prices, and those in the health sciences tend to have the highest.

In addition, the price of master's degrees is usually higher than that of bachelor's degrees. This is a common feature in Spain that is not often found in the rest of Europe, where there is a tendency to establish price equality. In this sense, non-qualifying master's degrees usually have a higher enrollment rate than qualifying ones.

There are exceptions to these trends: Castilla-La Mancha is the only region in which the prices of bachelor's degrees are equal to those of master's degrees; and Andalusia has traditionally maintained a common price for all its bachelor's degrees, regardless of the branch of knowledge to which they belong.

=== Variation between communities ===
Since the transfer of competences in education and, more specifically, those related to the regulation of public university prices at the end of the 90s, there has been a progressive increase in the disparity of prices between the autonomous communities. This was notably accentuated between the years 2009 and 2013, characterized by a tendency to increase fees as a consequence of the policies implemented by the former Minister of Education, José Ignacio Wert and the application of the Bologna plan. This increase was especially marked in the Community of Madrid and Catalonia, with a price difference up to three times greater between the highest and lowest public matriculation fees. The price disparity occurs in bachelor's degree, master's degrees and doctoral enrollments alike.

Autonomous communities of Spain	Average price of a first bachelor's degree matriculation in euros (€) per academic year (Note: Graph calculated using data expressed in price per ECTS credit provided by the Spanish Ministry of Universities. To calculate the price of an bachelor's degree enrollment, this data has been multiplied by 60 in each case, since a standard enrollment in Spain is equivalent to 60 ECTS credits.)												
Autonomous communities of Spain	2009-2010	2010-2011	2011-2012	2012-2013	2013-2014	2014-2015	2015-2016	2016-2017	2017-2018	2018-2019	2019-2020	2020-2021	2021-2022
Catalonia	1044,0	1122,0	1206,0	2010,0	2010,0	2010,0	2010,0	2010,0	2010,0	2010,0	2011,2	1362,0	1386,0
Community of Madrid	1002,0	1044,0	1098,0	1512,0	1818,0	1818,0	1620,0	1554,0	1478,4	1441,8	1441,8	1441,8	1404,0
Andalusia	690,0	702,0	732,0	749,4	757,2	757,2	757,2	757,2	757,2	757,2	757,2	757,2	756,0
Aragon	1045,2	1066,2	1104,6	1144,2	1185,0	1209,0	1209,0	1209,0	1124,4	1124,4	1124,4	1068,0	1092,0
Asturias	928,2	979,2	1027,8	1027,8	1027,8	1027,8	1027,8	1027,8	1027,8	976,8	732,6	732,6	738,0
Balearic Islands	879,0	904,8	937,8	1024,2	1075,2	1075,2	1075,2	1075,2	1075,2	967,8	967,8	967,8	960,0
Canary Islands	610,8	619,8	642,6	912,6	912,6	912,6	912,6	912,6	840,0	756,0	702,6	702,6	750,0
Cantabria	719,4	730,2	756,6	783,6	810,0	810,0	810,0	810,0	780,0	780,0	781,8	780,0	810,0
Castilla La-Mancha	735,6	747,0	774,0	931,2	914,4	948,6	948,6	948,6	948,6	948,6	948,6	948,6	954,0
Castile and León	971,4	903,6	964,2	1367,4	1386,6	1400,4	1400,4	1400,4	1400,4	1306,8	1042,8	996,0	990,0
Valencian Community	812,4	844,8	908,4	1211,4	1223,4	1223,4	1223,4	1223,4	1137,6	1039,8	1039,8	1020,0	1020,0
Extremadura	N/A	817,8	847,2	863,4	884,4	884,4	884,4	884,4	884,4	884,4	884,4	884,4	870,0
Galicia	678,6	688,8	713,4	713,4	713,4	713,4	713,4	713,4	713,4	713,4	713,4	713,4	714,0
Region of Murcia	743,4	780,0	819,0	915,6	934,8	934,8	934,8	934,8	934,8	934,8	934,8	934,8	942,0
Navarre	846,0	1052,4	1094,4	1138,2	1153,2	1153,2	1153,2	1153,2	1179,6	1179,0	1179,0	1134	1176,0
Basque Country	N/A	931,8	965,4	984,6	1008,6	1012,8	1012,8	1012,8	1012,8	1012,8	1012,8	1012,8	1020,0
La Rioja	811,8	1026,0	1063,2	1085,4	1102,2	1102,2	1102,2	1102,2	1186,2	1186,2	978,0	942,0	1014,0

The price disparity is not only in the base price of their academic degrees. There are variations in the increase in the price per credit in successive enrollments, as well as different filters applicable according to the origin of the student (EU, non-EU, resident or non-resident) that affect the price in very different ways and vary widely according to the regulations of the community. These differences also apply to peri-academic matters such as the price of fees for the issuing of degrees, the fees for payment of the University Entrance Examination or administration fees.

A 2016 report on price variation between each autonomous community concluded that "In general, prices and the criteria for their establishment are not consistent between autonomous communities, have no apparent justification —explained in the price decrees— and, in some cases, do not abide by the rules dictated in the law."

=== May 27, 2020 Agreement ===
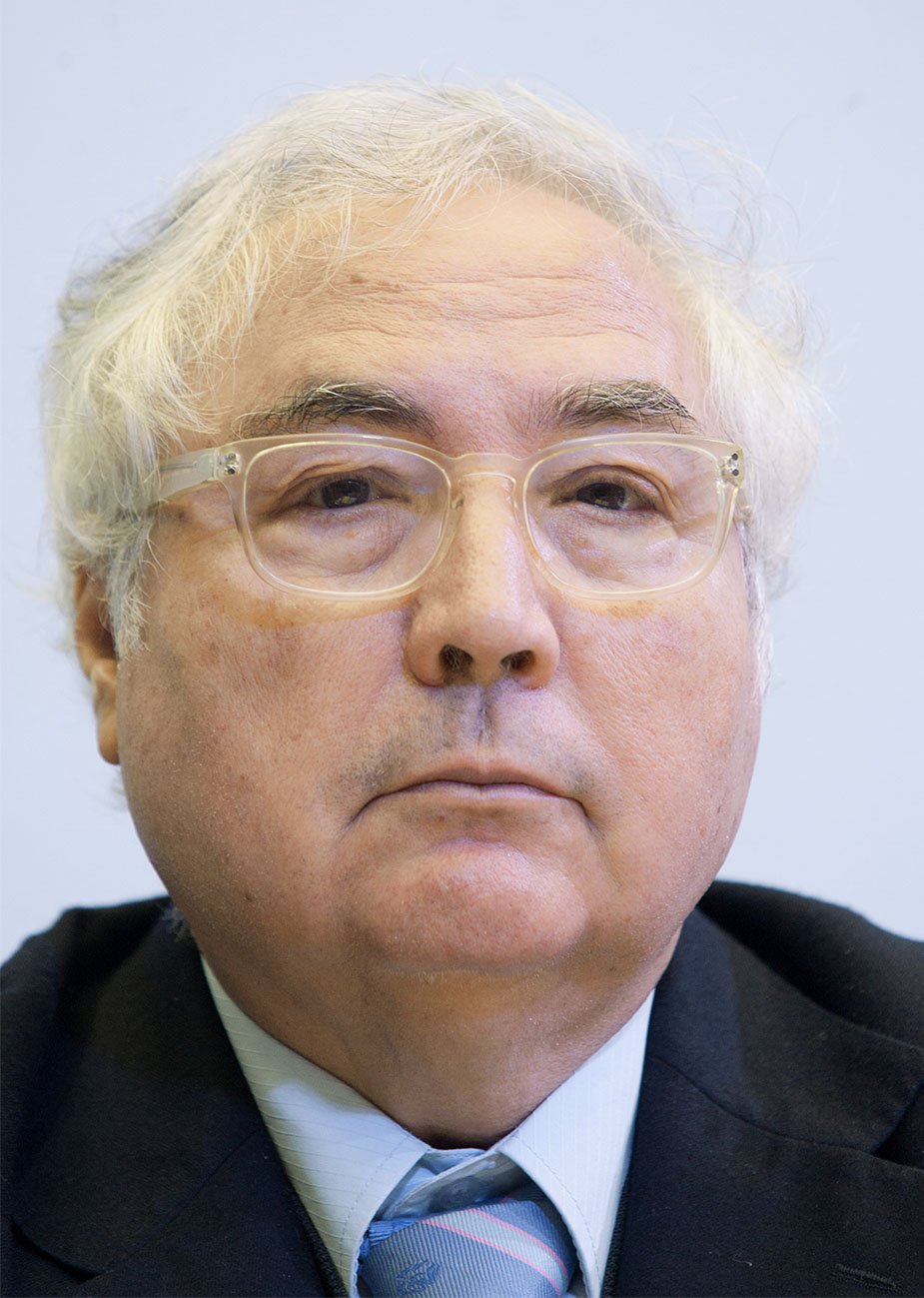
Manuel Castells, Minister of Universities in charge of promoting the proposal to reduce public prices

In May 2020, the Ministry of Universities established a mechanism whereby maximum public prices would be set by the state. This price limitation would exclusively affect the price of the first bachelor's degree matriculation courses and the communities would have until the 2022–2023 academic year to apply the reduction. As for master's degrees and doctoral enrollments, the mechanism does not establish limitations on the maximum price, but limits the ability of the communities to increase the price. The measure does not set a minimum price, and the maximum price is not specified in the document, but would be based on the price of the national average, with a limit on the upward variation with respect to this calculated by an index of 100. In practice, this would mean that the average price would be set at 16.05 euros per ECTS credit per degree in Spain, to which is added 15% as the maximum value of the cost.

The proposal was presented to the representatives of each autonomous community by the Minister of Universities, Manuel Castells, at a meeting on May 27, 2020, and was approved on July 7 of the same year. At the meeting there was no unanimity regarding the implementation of the proposal, and a number of autonomous governments (Andalusia, Madrid, Castile and León, Murcia and Euskadi), most of them then governed by the Popular Party, were reluctant.

The reduction in public prices would not affect the communities with the least expensive matriculation fees: Andalusia, Asturias, the Canary Islands, Cantabria, Castilla-La Mancha, Galicia and Murcia. On the other hand, another eight communities (Aragón, Baleares, Castile and León, Comunidad Valenciana, Extremadura, Navarra, País Vasco and La Rioja) would have to make a moderate adjustment, while in the case of Catalonia and Madrid the adjustment would be more significant.

The largest reductions would therefore occur in the universities of Catalonia, having to reduce the average cost by 43% over three years, which was more inflated with respect to the national average due to a series of increases introduced during the Convergence and Union government, which meant an increase of 66% between 2010 and 2015. Madrid would be the second that would have to implement a greater reduction, with an expected decrease of 20.7%. The drop would be smaller in the Valencian Community (-12.62%), Navarra (-7.14%), Basque Country (-4.71%), Extremadura (-4.19%), Aragón (-4.1%), La Rioja (-3.52%), Balearic Islands (-3%) and Castile and León (-2.68%).

For the year 2020–2021, only five communities (Aragón, Catalonia, Valencian Community, Navarra and La Rioja) applied a reduction in fees, and all of them -except Aragón and La Rioja that carried out the complete reduction that same year- would have the following two academic years to reach the limit established by the agreement. The Community of Madrid, despite being the second with the second largest reduction to be applied, maintained the same public prices with respect to the year 2019–2020. The largest reduction was in Catalonia, whose matriculation fees for that year were 720 euros cheaper on average, relieving the first place to the Community of Madrid as the region where it is more expensive to enter the university.

=== March 29, 2021 Agreement ===
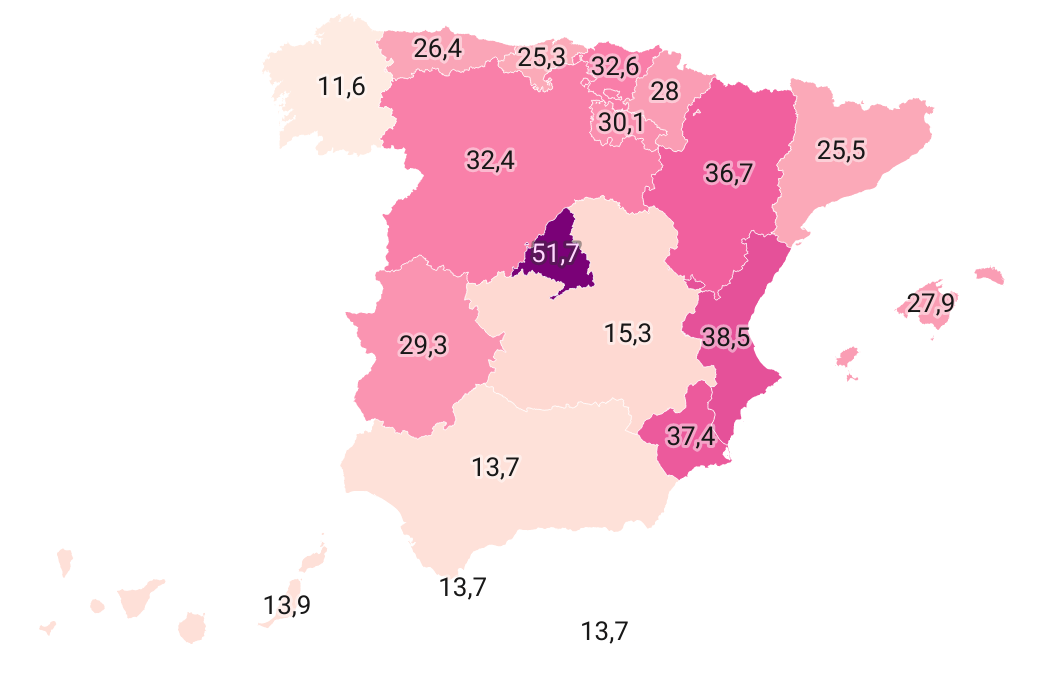
Price per master's degree credit in Spain by autonomous community (year 2021–2022). The map shows the average price per ECTS credit of a first non-qualifying master's degree in each autonomous community in euros

In March 2021, the General Conference on University Policy (CGPU) agreed to equalize the matriculation fees for qualifying master's degrees to those of bachelor's degrees. Qualifying master's degrees, which in many schools are heirs to the Final Degree Projects (PFC) prior to the Bologna Plan, were a mandatory requirement for the full exercise of regulated professional activities, but their fees are typically higher than those of the bachelor's degree. This implied a large investment on the part of students, making access to these professions economically difficult. Its equalization, which had been one of the major claims of student groups and which had already been implemented in some communities, was brought to the CGPU on March 29, 2021, at the proposal of the Ministry of Universities, and was approved by absolute majority with the only vote against of the Community of Madrid. This effective reduction of the fees for the qualifying master's degrees will have to be implemented in all the communities before the academic year 2022-2023 and will mean a reduction of 10.5 million euros in the income from tuition fees, which will have to be compensated by the autonomous communities.

=== Scholarships and grants ===
The objective of the scholarships, as stated in the BOE, is to provide access to higher education to anyone who needs it, providing equal opportunities to all students, regardless of their place of residence or socioeconomic status. In this sense, anyone who for economic reasons does not have the ability to access public education may be eligible to receive aid for this purpose, and will be applied a total or partial exemption from the payment of public prices:

In order to ensure that no one is excluded from studying at university for economic reasons, the Government and the Autonomous Communities, as well as the universities themselves, will implement a policy of scholarships, aid and credits for students and, in the case of public universities, will also establish modalities of partial or total exemption from the payment of public prices for the provision of academic services. In all cases, special attention will be paid to people with family responsibilities, victims of gender violence and people with dependency and disability, thus guaranteeing their access and permanence in university studies.

In the 2018–2019 academic year, 29.9% of students enrolled in a Spanish public university obtained scholarship status. According to data from the Ministry of Universities, the call for general scholarships (often known as "MEC scholarships") is the one that brings together the largest number of beneficiaries. This corresponds to approximately 80% (with annual variations) of the total amount allocated to scholarships. The amount of the general scholarship, the amount of which may vary according to, among other things, the economic conditions of the applicant or the applicant's family, is always linked to a right to exemption from the payment of matriculation fees, so that students who receive it do not have to pay tuition fees.

The proportion of students receiving the general scholarship, however, varies widely from one autonomous community to another. For example, for the 2016–2017 academic year, one in four bachelor's degree students receiving a scholarship in Spain studied at an Andalusian university, while only 19% of all enrolled students study there.

== Tuition fees at private universities ==
The private university is a relatively recent institution in Spanish history. The law that allowed its introduction dates back to 1993 and was promoted by the PSOE government of the time.

As of 2020, there were a total of 36 private universities in Spain. The financing regime of private universities is completely independent of the state, so that students often bear 100% of the cost of their education. As a result, private universities generally have significantly higher matriculation fees than public universities in Spain. Moreover, as they are not subject to a homogeneous price regulation system, fees between each university can vary widely: for example, in 2013–2014, the average price of a year's bachelor's degree at a private university in Madrid was €8150; in the 2017–2018 academic year, it cost an average of €16 894 per year to study a medical degree at a private university in the country.
