= Academic ranks in Spain =

Academic ranks in Spain are the titles, relative importance and authority of professors, researchers, and administrative personnel held in academia.

== Overview ==
According to the Spanish Organic University Law, the following are the academic ranks in Spain:

National Royal Academies:

- "Académico de Número" (Full Royal Academician with a numbered chair) (elected full academician in one of the National Academies, most of the academies are subject specific except for the Royal Academy of Doctors (Real Academia de Doctores) which is interdisciplinary. Appointments to the rank of numbered academician are published in the government gazette (BOE) and are for a lifetime. Numbered academicians enjoy the official style of "excellency" and are considered to be the maximum exponents of their disciplines. This is the highest academic rank that can be attained in Spain. There are fewer than a 1000 people who hold this title at any time.)
- Académico Correspondiente" (Corresponding Academician) (elected corresponding academican in one of the National Academies. Appointment to the rank of the corresponding academician is for a lifetime and they enjoy the treatment of "ilustrísimo Sr. ". Corresponding academicians are prominent members of their disciplines, mostly prominent full professors and in some rare cases associate professors. Foreigners can also be appointed to this rank such as the Nobel Prize economists who serve as corresponding academicians of the Royal Academy of Economic and Financial Sciences. Corresponding academicians are not entitled to vote in the meetings of the Academies.)

Tenured, civil servants:

- Catedrático de Universidad (Distinguished Professor); in a German context Professor W3; in British context, Professor (tenured, full/part time, civil servant, PhD required, accreditation required)
- Profesor Titular de Universidad (Professor); in a German context Professor W2; in a British context Reader/ Senior Lecturer (tenured, full/part time, civil servant, PhD required, accreditation required)

Tenured, non civil servants:

- Profesor Contratado Doctor (Associate Professor); in a German context Juniorprofessor; in a British context Lecturer (tenured, full time, not a civil servant, PhD required, accreditation required)
- Profesor de Universidad Privada (Associate professor) (only for private universities, PhD required, accreditation required)
- Profesor Colaborador (Lecturer) (tenured, full time, not a civil servant, does not have to hold a PhD, accreditation required, to be phased out)

In the autonomous regions of Basque Country and Catalonia there are 2 additional tenured figures, according to relevant prevailing legislation:

- Profesor Pleno/Catedràtic Contractat, a non civil servant, tenured but not immovable for economic or political reasons' (Full Professor) (tenured, full-time, not a civil servant, PhD required, accreditation required Not equivalent to Catedrático de Universidad, a civil servant.
- Profesor Agregado (Associate Professor) Tenured but not immovable for economic or political reasons'(tenured, full-time, not a civil servant, PhD required, accreditation required,. Not equivalent to Profesor Titular de Universidad (an inmovable and independent civil servan); it is not enough to qualify for Catedrático de Universidad (Profesor Titular is requiered)
- Profesor Ayudante Doctor (Assistant Professor) (must hold a PhD, accreditation required) (Profesor Adjunto in Basque Country, Professor Lector in Catalonia)
- Profesor Ayudante (Teaching Assistant) (does not need to hold a PhD, but usually is a PhD student)

Other positions:

Teaching positions:

- Profesor Asociado (a part time instructor who keeps a parallel job)
- Profesor Visitante (Visiting Professor)
- Profesor Emérito (Emeritus Professor, keeps teaching and academic roles beyond retirement age, with the legal pension as salary)
- Profesor Titular de Escuela Universitaria (Tenured, PhD not required, to be extinguished)
- Profesor Sustituto Interino (Non-tenured, PhD not required, position created for substitutions in Andalusian universities).

Research-only positions:

- Técnico Superior de Investigación (Senior technical officer)
- Técnico Medio de Investigación (Technical officer)

Administrative ranks

Universities:

- Rector (necessarily a chair professor)
- Vicerectors
- General secretary
- Manager

Faculties, university schools and technical schools:

- Dean (faculty) or head (university or technical school)
- Vicedeans or deputy heads
- Secretary

Research institutes:

- Head of research institute
- Deputy head of research institute
- Secretary of research institute

Departments:

- Head of department
- Deputy head of department
- Secretary of department

Honorary positions (only in Catholic universities):

- Grand chancellor
- Vicechancellor

== Faculty ==
=== Selection procedures ===
In the past twenty-five years, Spain has gone through three university reforms: 1983 (Ley de Reforma Universitaria, LRU), 2001 (Ley Orgánica de Universidades, LOU) and 2007 (a mere reform of the LOU with several specific modifications of the 2001 Act). We can name them LRU 1983, LOU 2001 and LOU 2007.

The actual categories of tenured and untenured positions, and the basic department and university organization, were established by LRU 1983, and only specific details have been reformed by LOU 2001 and LOU 2007. The most important reform these later acts introduced is the way candidates to a position are selected. According to LRU 1983, a committee of five members had to evaluate the curricula of the candidates. A new committee was constituted for each new position, operating in the same university offering that position. These committees had two members appointed by the department (including the Secretary of the committee), and three members who were draw-selected (from any university, but belonging to the same "knowledge area").

The LOU 2001 and LOU 2007 acts have granted even more freedom to universities when choosing applicants for a position. Each university now freely establishes the rules for the creation of an internal committee that assigns available positions. However, the last reform also have introduced an external "quality control" process. To better understand these reforms, it is worth examining the situation both before and after 2007.

The situation before 2007 was this: LOU 2001 had established a procedure, based on competition at national level, to become a civil servant. This procedure, and the license a candidate obtained, was called "habilitación", and it included curricula evaluation and personal examinations. The external committee was formed by seven draw-selected members (belonging to the same "knowledge area" and fulfilling requisites related to research curricula), who could assign a fixed and pre-determined number of "habilitaciones" similar to the positions requested by the universities. An applicant to a particular position in any university had to be "habilitado" (licensed) by this National Committee in order to apply. Non-civil servants had a slightly different "quality control" process. A specific institution, called the Spanish Agency for Evaluation, Quality and Certification or ANECA by its Spanish acronym (Agencia Nacional de Evaluación de la Calidad y Acreditación), examined the applicants' curricula and issued them a positive evaluation called "acreditación" (certification) giving access to the exams to become a tenured-civil servant professor.

Today, following the LOU 2007 reform, the whole process has been simplified, and both civil and non civil servants need to achieve a positive evaluation of their teaching and research record by ANECA. Once the certification by ANECA is achieved, candidates can apply for the exams convened by each university to fulfill their vacant positions.

The certification system introduced by the LOU 2001 act and particularly the 2007 reform, which requires the candidate to pass a demanding evaluation process at a national level for each category before applying for a position, has increased the standards of Spanish university professors to those of most OECD countries.

The LOU act of 2001 maintained both traditional tenured and civil servant positions of "Profesor Titular" and "Catedrático de Universidad", albeit it also introduced the new non-civil servant tenured position of Profesor Contratado Doctor. Non-tenured positions include: Profesor Asociado (a part-time instructor who also works, for example, in industry, a hospital or news media), Ayudante (a doctoral student working as teaching assistant, with limited and supervised teaching capacity), and Profesor Ayudante Doctor (a promotion from the latter, after completing the doctoral dissertation).

=== Positions ===
Under present legislation (LOSU 2023), only the following positions are available:

Tenured positions

- Catedrático de Universidad ("Prof. Cat.", "Cat." or "Prof."): full professor, tenured, full-time, civil servant, PhD required, "acreditación catedrático de universidad" required.
- Profesor Titular de Universidad (Prof.): associate professor, tenured, full-time, civil servant, PhD required, "acreditación profesor titular de universidad" required, European Union citizenship is required.

On those positions, one can be Head or hold a chair if they are elected by their faculty or departments for it.

Tenure-track positions

- Profesor Permanente Laboral ("Prof."): associate professor, tenure-track, full-time, not a civil servant, PhD required, "acreditación profesor contratado doctor" required.

Non-tenure positions

- Profesor Ayudante Doctor ("PAD" or at some universities "Prof."): assistant professor, non-tenured, full-time, not a civil servant, PhD required, habilitation not required, only for a limited period of time.
- Ayudante: teaching assistant, nontenured, full-time, not a civil servant, no PhD required, only for a limited period of time.

Other positions

- Profesor de Universidad Privada ("Prof."): private university position, tenured or non-tenured depending on the statutes of the university, full-time or part-time, PhD required, "acreditación profesor titular de universidad" or "acreditación profesor de universidad privada" not always required.
- Profesor Asociado ("Prof. asoc.", "Ass. Prof." or at some universities also "Prof."): adjunct/associate professor or professor of practice, non-tenured, part-time, not a civil servant, mostly PhD required.
- Profesor Visitante/Profesor Invitado ("PV", "PI" or at some universities also "Prof."): visiting professor, non-tenured, not a civil servant, no PhD required, only for a limited period of time (visiting professor).
- Profesor Emérito ("Prof." or "Prof. em."): professor emeritus, non-tenured, not a civil servant, only for a limited period of time, works under the specific rules established by the employing university.

Teaching staff positions continue to exist in certain categories (Professor Titular de Escuela Universitaria, Professor Colaborador) that have been abolished, but there is no new recruitment in these categories.

Of these six categories of tenured positions, four imply public service positions (funcionario):

- Catedrático de Universidad ("Prof. Cat.", "Cat." or "Prof.") (full professor),
- Profesor Titular de Universidad ("Prof.") (university professor on full professor level but without chair),
- Catedrático de Escuela Universitaria (fully equivalent in rank and salary to Professor Titular de Universidad; this category was abolished by LOU 2007), and
- Profesor Titular de Escuela Universitaria (this category was abolished by LOU 2007). This last category was intended for instructors at technical schools and colleges without a PhD. Instructors currently in this category will be able to keep their job until retiring, but no new positions will be created.

The Catedrático de Escuela Universitaria and the Profesor Titular de Universidad categories were merged by the LOU 2007 reform. The two de Escuela Universitaria categories were intended mainly for teachers of previous three-year degrees (e.g. technical engineering, nursing, teaching in primary schools), while the two de Universidad categories include professors of any undergraduate or graduate degrees.

=== Retirement ===
The retiring age for university professors in Spain is 70 while other workers is 66 (adjusting to 67). However, a university professor can work until he or she is 70, if he so wishes. Even then, they can apply for a Professor Emérito position. It is a non-tenured position and it has a limited duration (4 additional years). Also, there are specific rules established by each university.

=== Foreign qualifications in Spain ===
Spain places the following requirements for recognition of non-European qualifications:

- People with a degree from a foreign school or university (even if they are Spanish citizens) must apply to the Spanish Ministry of Education and Science for a conversion into its equivalent to any of the current Spanish degrees. First, one's bachelor's or master's degree must be converted; after that, it is possible to apply for the conversion of the PhD degree. This procedure can take sometimes more than three years, and can fail if the courses taken by the applicant in his lower degree are too different from those required for the closest Spanish degree. For European citizens, there is a somewhat faster procedure called recognition (which can also fail) but it is only suitable for positions that do not require a curriculum evaluation by ANECA (i.e., only the rank of Professor Ayudante).
- People with a bachelor's degree who have completed a PhD immediately afterwards (that is, skipping a two-year master's) have found it impossible to convert their degree, since the duration of their bachelor's was three years, while the Spanish bachelor's degree holders cannot go directly for a PhD, being as it is necessary to hold a licenciatura, which would be the roughly equivalent to a master's degree. Although Spanish university students must study the three years that would grant the bachelor's degree in any other country, they will very rarely be awarded a bachelor's degree (diplomado) and will have to study until finishing the full master's degree, which lasts from four to six years (four years for some degrees, including Law, Economics and Physics; six years for others, like Architecture, Engineering and Medicine).
- In addition, a Ph.D. course (curso de doctorado, a compulsory course, similar to a MPhil, that students must undertake to be able to defend their dissertation) in Spain lasts 1–2 years, but it usually takes two or more additional years to successfully complete and defend one's dissertation. Being a tough process as it is, statistics show that only about 5% of master's degree holders go for a PhD, and, all in all, only 10% of them accomplish it successfully, with the vast majority dropping it while in the PhD course (similar to the All But Dissertation phenomenon in English-speaking countries). These statistics are considerably higher for people studying technical or scientific subjects such as engineering, physics, medicine, etc., and the main reason of this is that getting a PhD in these cases only takes about three years, with a course structure very similar to those of the English-speaking world; in other areas, such as law, history, or economics, PhD rarely are awarded before six years of research, and in these cases dissertations tend to be considerably lengthier than those in the English-speaking world.
- Furthermore, to become a professor of civil servant type, the applicant must be a European citizen, or be married to a European citizen. As a last consideration, besides a good knowledge of the Spanish language, in regions such as Catalonia, the Balearic Islands, Valencia, the Basque Country and Galicia, a knowledge of the official regional language (e.g. Basque, Catalan, Galician) may be required. This could be a constraint to mobility for university professors in Spain, together with low salaries.

=== Research-only positions ===
There also exist permanent, research positions, without teaching duties. They are offered by certain public research institutions, the Public Scientific and Technical Research Establishments, for instance the Consejo Superior de Investigaciones Cientificas (CSIC). Again, people in these positions are civil servants (thus, in this sense, tenured). Their statute is governed by the Spanish Laws.

There are three levels:

- Cientifico Titular (Tenured Scientist): equivalent to profesor titular (Associate Professor). It is a permanent, research-only position.
- Investigador Cientifico (Research Scientist). It is a permanent, research-only position.
- Profesor de Investigacion (Research Full Professor): equivalent to catedratico (Full Professor). It is a permanent, research-only position.

The main differences between these research positions and the faculty positions are, of course, the absence of teaching duties, and the ability to move between different labs (for example, a CSIC researcher can request to move to any CSIC center in Spain or abroad, whereas a faculty member is employed by a specific university).
