= João Afonso Telo de Meneses, 2nd Lord of Albuquerque =

Lord of Albuquerque

João Afonso Telo de Meneses
- Lord
- Born: 13th-century Kingdom of Portugal
- Died: 13th-century Kingdom of Portugal

João Afonso Telo de Meneses (1200s-1268) was a Portuguese nobleman, 2nd Lord of Albuquerque, and alferes-mor of Afonso III of Portugal.

== Biography ==
João was the son of Alfonso Téllez de Meneses and Teresa Sanches, daughter of Sancho I of Portugal. His wife was Elvira González Girón, daughter of Rodrigo Gutiérrez Girón (Butler of Alfonso VIII of Castile).

João Afonso Telo de Meneses, was the grandson of Tello Pérez de Meneses.
