= Fernán Gutiérrez de Castro =

Spanish nobleman

- Lord of Lemos and Sarria
- Born: Iberian Peninsula
- Died: Spain
- Noble family: House of Castro
- Spouse: Milia Íñiguez de Mendoza
- Father: Gutierre Rodríguez de Castro
- Mother: Elvira Osorio

Fernán Gutiérrez de Castro (1180–1233) was a Spanish nobleman, Lord of Lemos and Sarria, Alférez real during the Kingdom of Castile.

== Biography ==
Fernán was born in Spain, the son of Gutierre Rodríguez de Castro and Elvira Osorio. His wife was Milia Íñiguez daughter of Íñigo López de Mendoza and María García
