= Tello Pérez de Meneses =

Castilian magnate and military leader

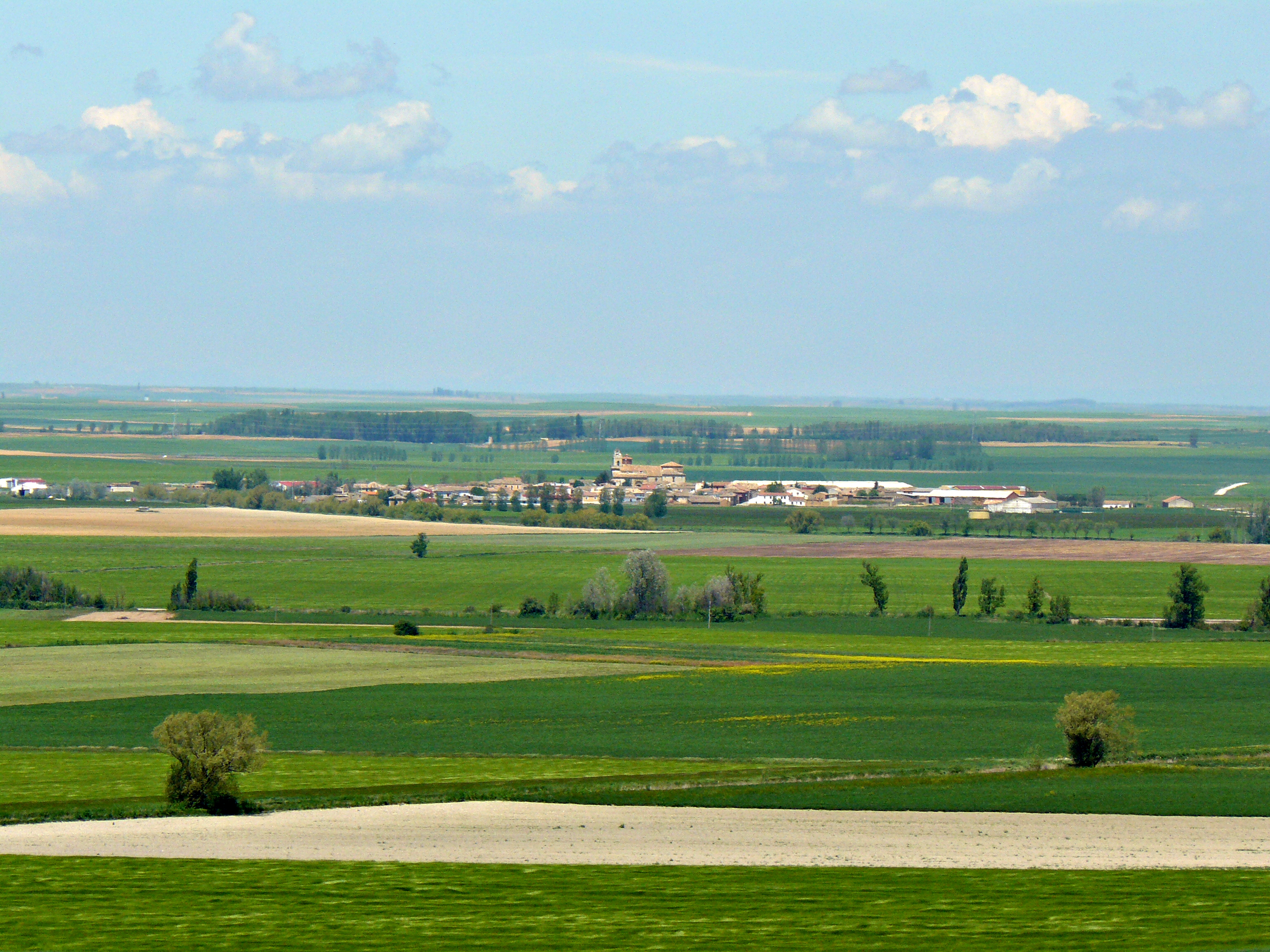
View of Meneses from Montealegre

Tello Pérez de Meneses (died c. 1200) was a Castilian magnate and military leader under the reign of King Alfonso VIII of Castile, and the ancestor of the Téllez de Meneses, a prominent noble lineage, whose descendants include several royal members such as Queen María de Molina, Tello's great-granddaughter, and Leonor Telles de Meneses, queen consort of Portugal. Tello participated in several military campaigns during the Reconquista and subsequent Repoblación, and was also a generous founder and patron of monasteries and hospitals for captives and lepers. Together with the Girón, the Téllez de Meneses were among the most influential and powerful aristocratic groups in Tierra de Campos.

== Family background ==
Tello's name in contemporary Latin charters is Tellus Petri or Petriz. His mother's name is not known. His father was Pedro Martínez, son of Martín Pérez, lord of Tordesillas and merino mayor of Queen Urraca. Although the filiation of Martín Pérez remains unknown, he must have been a member of the highest ranks of the nobility having married, as her second husband, Mayor Pérez, the widow of Álvar Fáñez, and daughter of count Pedro Ansúrez and his wife countess Eylo Alfonso.

== At the court, tenencias and estates, military campaigns and repopulation ==
Tello Pérez de Meneses was a distinguished member of the curia regis of King Alfonso VIII of Castile whom he served as a loyal vassal and from whom he received many royal favors.

He owned vast estates in the eastern part of Tierra de Campos, some of which were adjacent to Torozos including Meneses and Montealegre. He also owned land in the valley of the Sequillo River and other properties along the Way of St. James, where he founded hospitals for pilgrims and lepers.

He was tenente of Cea in 1181, a region where he also owned several estates, as well as of Meneses. On 3 February 1184 Tello received a gift of some mills at Villanueva on the Cea from Alfonso VIII.

In 1177, he fought and led the Christian armies in the nine-month siege of Cuenca until the city surrendered on 21 September of that year.

Tello was in charge of repopulating the valley of the Guadiana, in the region extending from the Tablas de Daimiel wetlands to the estuary of the Jabalón River as part of an agreement with the Order of Calatrava pursuant to which Tello was entrusted with the task of bringing cattle and Moorish slaves to the region of Calatrava la Vieja. As compensation for his efforts, Tello was granted the rights of usufruct during his lifetime and at his death, all the property and half of the cattle would revert to the order. Also as compensation, he was granted the villa of Ocaña during his lifetime. He and his wife had previously donated Ocaña, which they had received from Alfonso VIII, to the Order of Calatrava in January 1177, during the siege of Cuenca. In the same month, King Alfonso also gave Tello several houses in Cuenca in exchange for the castle of Malagón which Tello donated subsequently for the construction and upkeep of a hospital for captives in this city.

== Religious patronage and foundations ==
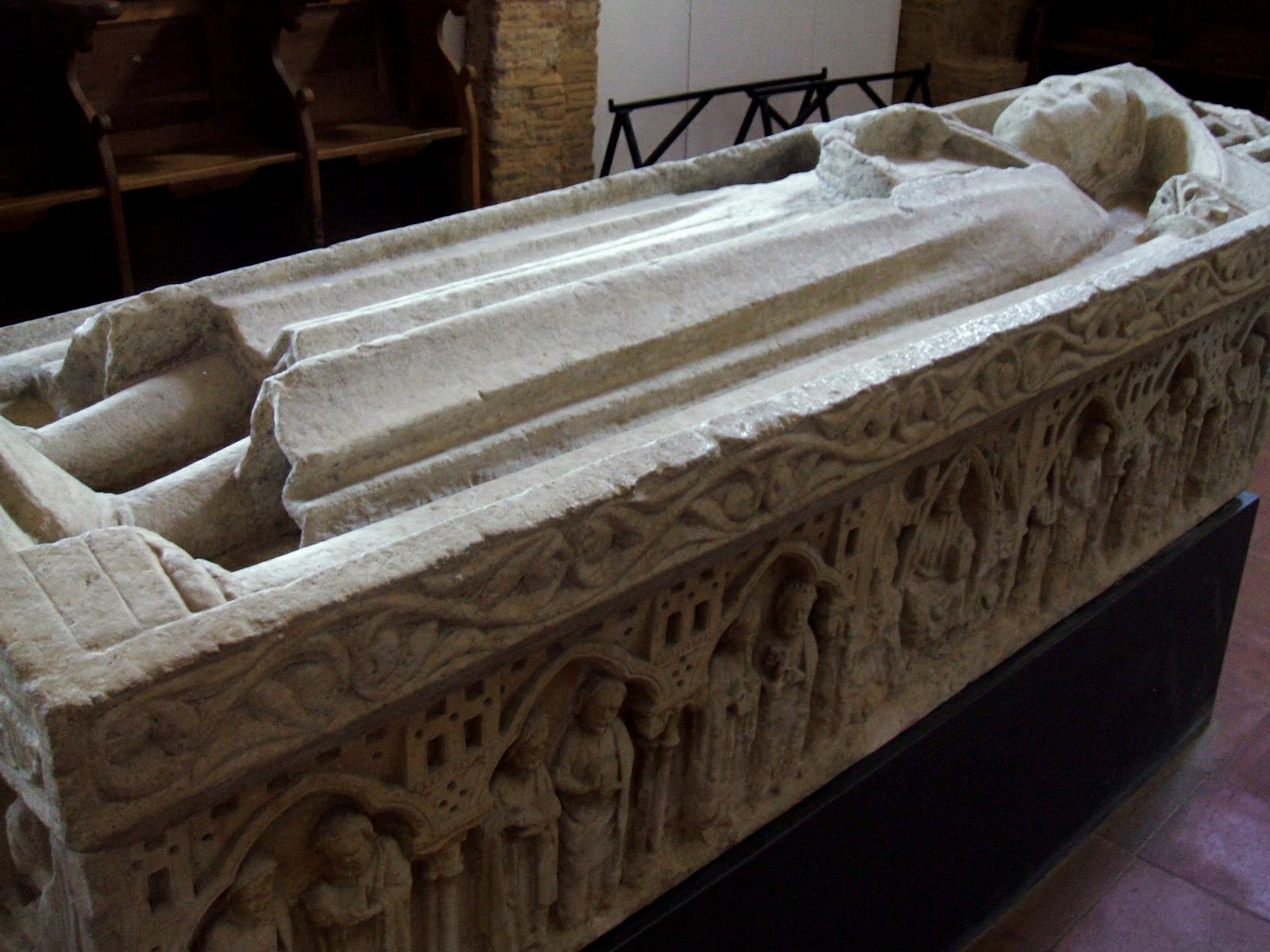
13th-century Gothic sarcophagus from the Monastery of Santa María de Trianos, now at the Church of San Tirso in Sahagún.

In November 1173, King Alfonso VIII gave Tello and his wife Gontrodo his properties in Matallana and, in 1175, the same king confirmed the foundation of the Monastery of Santa María de Matallana by Tello and his wife. The document was confirmed by the five children of this marriage; Alfonso, García, Tello, Suero, and Teresa. This monastery is situated in Villalba de los Alcores in the province of Valladolid.

On 13 March 1182, Tello and his relative Pedro Gutiérrez and his wife María Boso, founded a hospital for captives and pilgrims in Cuenca which they handed over to the Order of Santiago for its administration. The "captives" of the hospitalis captiuorum were former prisoners-of-war of the Muslims.

With his wife and children, Tello made a generous donation in 1185 to the Monastery of Santa María de Trianos which included his estates and properties in Trianos, Villacreces, Tordellos, San Nicolás del Real Camino and Fresno, properties which he and his mother-in-law, Teresa Pérez, abbess at the monastery in Gradefes, had previously acquired. The following June, King Alfonso VIII confirmed this donation and donated additional properties. Although the foundation of this monastery has been attributed to Tello and his wife, the monastery already existed in 1125 when on 7 of December of that year, Pope Honorius II issued a papal bull appointing the abbot and the prior of this religious establishment. Tello and his descendants continued to be the patrons and benefactors of this monastery.

In 1195, Tello and his wife founded a hospital for lepers in San Nicolás del Real Camino which they subsequently donated to the Monastery of Santa María de Trianos, also founding, on 6 December 1196, another hospital for lepers in Villamartín, near Carrión de los Condes, the administration of which they later entrusted to the Order of Santiago.

With the consent of his five children, all of whom are mentioned in the charter, Tello made a generous donation in July 1195 to a monastery in Villanueva de San Mancio which had been founded a century earlier but whose assets had diminished considerably. Tello and his children later donated this monastery to the Monastery of Sahagún in 1198.

Tello Pérez de Meneses probably died in the first half of 1200 since his children made a donation in June of that year to the abbot of the Monastery of Sahagún and certainly before April 1201 when again, they made a donation of several properties for the souls of their parents. According to the 16th-century historian Ambrosio de Morales, the sarcophagi of the founders were in the main chapel of the disappeared Monastery of Matallana.

== Marriage and issue ==
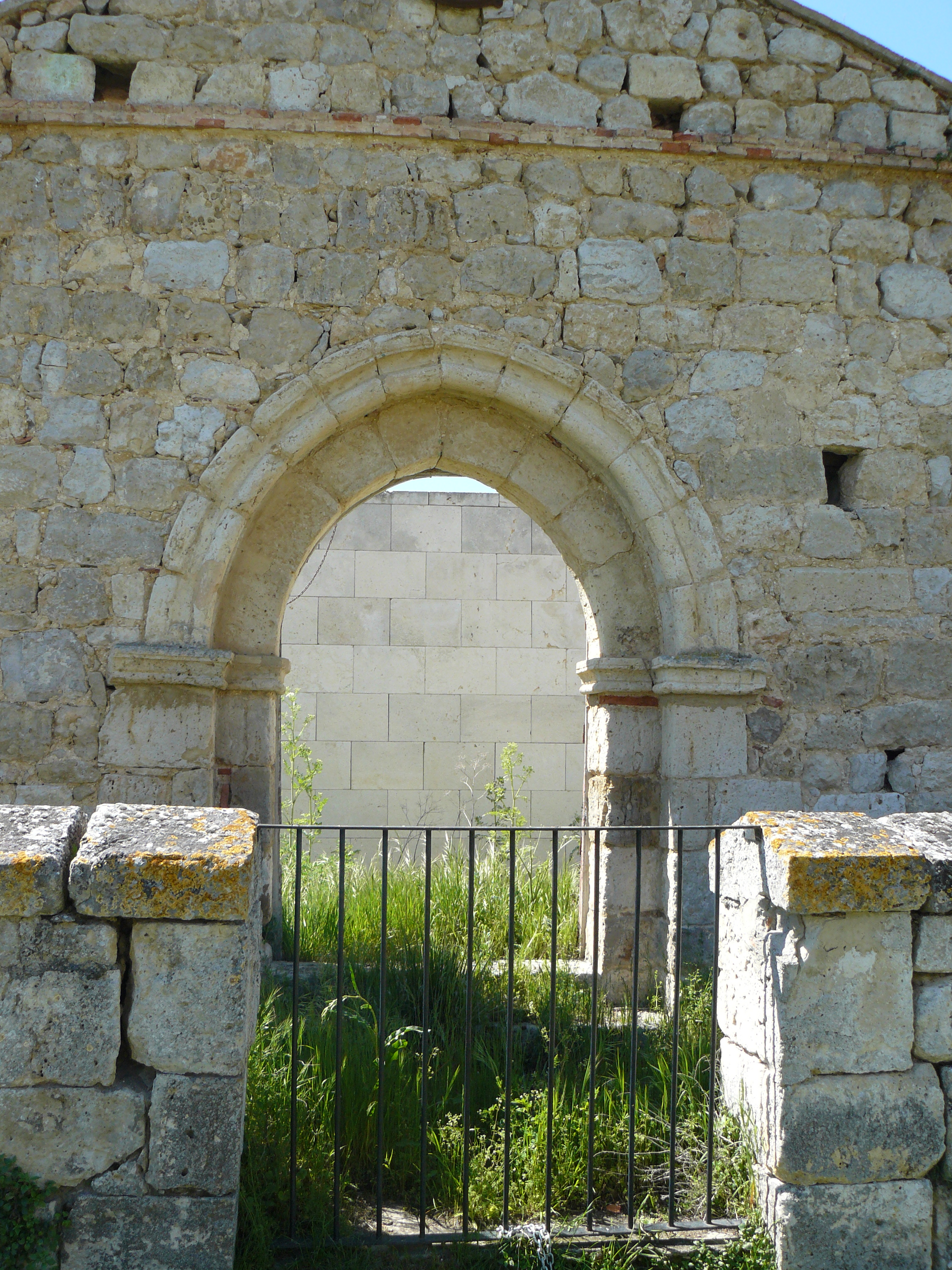
Ruins of the Monasterio de Santa María de Matallana

On 22 June 1161, Tello granted arras to his wife Gontrodo García. The properties included Meneses, Villa Avia, Barrio Falcón, Villa Nova, and Castriello. Gontrodo probably contributed properties and estates that she had inherited from the Flaínez family in Tierra de Campos. As a great-granddaughter of Martín Flaínez, one of the counts who died in the Battle of Uclés Gontrodo was the daughter of García Pérez (died in September 1165), tenente in Cea, and of Teresa Pérez (died on 10 May 1187), the founders of the Cistercian Monastery of Santa María la Real de Gradefes where Teresa, as a widow, became a nun and later its abbess. They had five children, all born between 1161 and 1175. All the male offspring took part in the Battle of Navas de Tolosa in June 1212.

- Alfonso Téllez de Meneses, who inherited the majorat and played an important role in the political crisis that ensued after the early and accidental death of Henry I of Castile.
- García Téllez, who died young and is the ancestor of the Tello lineage in Seville.
- Tello Téllez de Meneses, Bishop of Palencia.
- Suero Téllez de Meneses (died c. 1227), was the tenant-in-chief of Montealegre, Tordehumos, Grajal, and Cea and a staunch supporter of Queen Berenguela of Castile. He married Sancha Gutiérrez, daughter of Gutierre Rodríguez de Castro and Elvira Osorio with whom he had two children: Gutierre and Fernando Suárez de Meneses, the former being the ancestor of the Tellez de Meneses of Toledo, and the latter a member of the clergy in Palencia. In 1227, Suero and his wife made a donation to the Monastery of Benevívere of his estate in Cisneros, Palencia.
- Teresa Téllez, who married Martín Pérez.

== Bibliography ==
- Alonso Álvarez, Raquel (2007). "Los promotores de la Orden del Císter en los reinos de Castilla y León: Familias aristocráticas y damas nobles". Anuario de Estudios Medievales (in Spanish). 37 (37/2): 653–710. doi:10.3989/aem.2007.v37.i2.50. hdl:10651/21710. ISSN 0066-5061.
- Ara Gil, Clementina Julia (September 2009). "Monasterio de Santa María de Matallana" (PDF). Argaya: Revista de Cultura (in Spanish). Diputación de Valladolid: 7–24. Archived from the original (PDF) on 2013-09-27.
- Barón Faraldo, Andrés (2006). Grupos y dominios aristocráticos en la Tierra de Campos oriental, Siglos X-XIII (in Spanish). Palencia: Monografías. ISBN 84-8173-122-6.
- Barton, Simon (1997). The Aristocracy in Twelfth-Century León and Castile. Cambridge: Cambridge University Press.
- Calvo, Aurelio (1945). El Monasterio de Gradefes: Apuntes para su historia y la de algunos otros cenobios y pueblos del Concejo (in Spanish). León: Imprenta Provincial. OCLC 4156821.
- Castán Lanaspa, Guillermo; Castán Lanaspa, Javier (1992). Documentos del Monasterio de Santa María de Trianos (Siglos XII-XIII) (in Spanish). Salamanca: Ediciones Universidad de Salamanca. ISBN 84-7481-713-7.
- Castán Lanaspa, Guillermo (1984). "San Nicolás del Real Camino: Un hospital de leprosos castellano-leonés en la Edad Media" (PDF). Publicaciones de la Institución Tello Téllez de Meneses (in Spanish) (51). ISSN 0210-7317.
- Martínez Martín, Manuel (2006). "Claves para una tesis: las murallas medievales de Valladolid" (PDF). Historia, Instituciones, Documentos (in Spanish) (33). Universidad de Sevilla: Departamento de Historia Medieval y Ciencias y Técnicas Historiográficas: 365–421. ISSN 0210-7716.
- Ruiz Gómez, Francisco (2003). Los orígenes de las órdenes militares y la repoblación de los territorios de La Mancha (1150-1250) (in Spanish). Consejo Superior de Investigaciones Científicas. ISBN 84-00-08159-5.
- Salcedo Tapia, Modesto (1999). La familia Téllez de Meneses en los tronos de Castilla y Portugal (in Spanish). Palencia: Institución Tello Téllez de Meneses CECEL-CSIC, y Diputación de Palencia, Departamento de Cultura. ISBN 848173-070-X.
- Sánchez de Mora, Antonio (2003). "La nobleza castellana en la plena Edad Media: el linaje de Lara. Tesis doctoral. Universidad de Sevilla" (in Spanish).
- Torres Sevilla-Quiñones de León, Margarita Cecilia (1999). Linajes nobiliarios de León y Castilla: Siglos IX-XIII (in Spanish). Salamanca: Junta de Castilla y León, Consejería de Educación y Cultura. ISBN 84-7846-781-5.
