= Telos (disambiguation) =

Telos (τέλος) refers to the philosophical concept of purpose. Telos may also refer to:

== Companies ==
- Telos (company), a defense contractor and software business in Ashburn, Virginia
- The Telos Alliance, a manufacturer of equipment for broadcasting stations
- Telos Publishing, a publishing company that deals primarily in horror/fantasy and unofficial program guides

== Computer science ==
- TELOS, acronym for The EuLisp Object System
- Telos, name of a knowledge representation language used in ConceptBase

== In fiction ==
- Telos (Doctor Who), a planet in the television series Doctor Who
- T-elos, an antagonist in the video game series Xenosaga
- Telos is a planet and a character in the DC Comics series Convergence (comics)
- Telos, a boss monster in the MMORPG RuneScape
- A planet in Star Wars appearing in the video game Knights of the Old Republic II: The Sith Lords and the novel The Day of Reckoning

== Music ==
- Telos (Forevermore album), 2014
- Telos (Zedd album), 2024
- "Telos", a song by Between the Buried and Me from the album The Parallax II: Future Sequence

== Other uses ==
- Telos Lake, in Maine
- Tilos (ancient Greek: Telos), a Greek island in the Dodecanese
- Telos (journal), a journal of politics, philosophy, and critical theory, and its accompanying publishing company, Telos Press
- TELOS (project management), an acronym used in Project Management regarding feasibility studies

== See also ==
- Tellos, a fantasy comic book series
- Tellos Agras, the nom de guerre of Greek officer Sarantis-Tellos Agapinos (c. 1880–1907)
- Telo (disambiguation)
