= Gutierre Rodríguez de Castro =

Castilian nobleman

- Born: 1140s
- Died: c. 1195
- Noble family: House of Castro
- Father: Rodrigo Fernández de Castro
- Mother: Elo Álvarez

Gutierre Rodríguez de Castro also known as Gutierre Ruiz de Castro and nicknamed el Escalabrado (died c. 1195) was a Castilian nobleman, member of the House of Castro as the son of Rodrigo Fernández de Castro and his wife Elo Álvarez, daughter of Álvar Fáñez and his wife Mayor Pérez, daughter of Count Pedro Ansúrez.

== Life ==
King Alfonso VII of León had appointed Gutierre's paternal uncle, Gutierre Fernández de Castro, guardian and tutor of his son, Infante Sancho, the future King Sancho III of Castile. It was during the crisis of the regency, exercised by Manrique Pérez de Lara, that Gutierre, with his brothers, Fernando, Pedro and Álvaro abandoned Castile due to their differences with the members of the House of Lara and sought refuge in the Kingdom of León to serve King Ferdinand II, where the four brothers were appointed to relevant posts. Gutierre appears between 1180 and 1186 governing several locations as tenente during different periods. The first of these was Benavente in 1180, in 1182 several regions in Galicia in the area of Toroño and Lemos and Montenegro as well as Villalpando in Zamora, Asturias and Extremadura. His presence is attested in several royal charters from 1186 to 1190 in Castile in the curia regis of King Alfonso VIII.

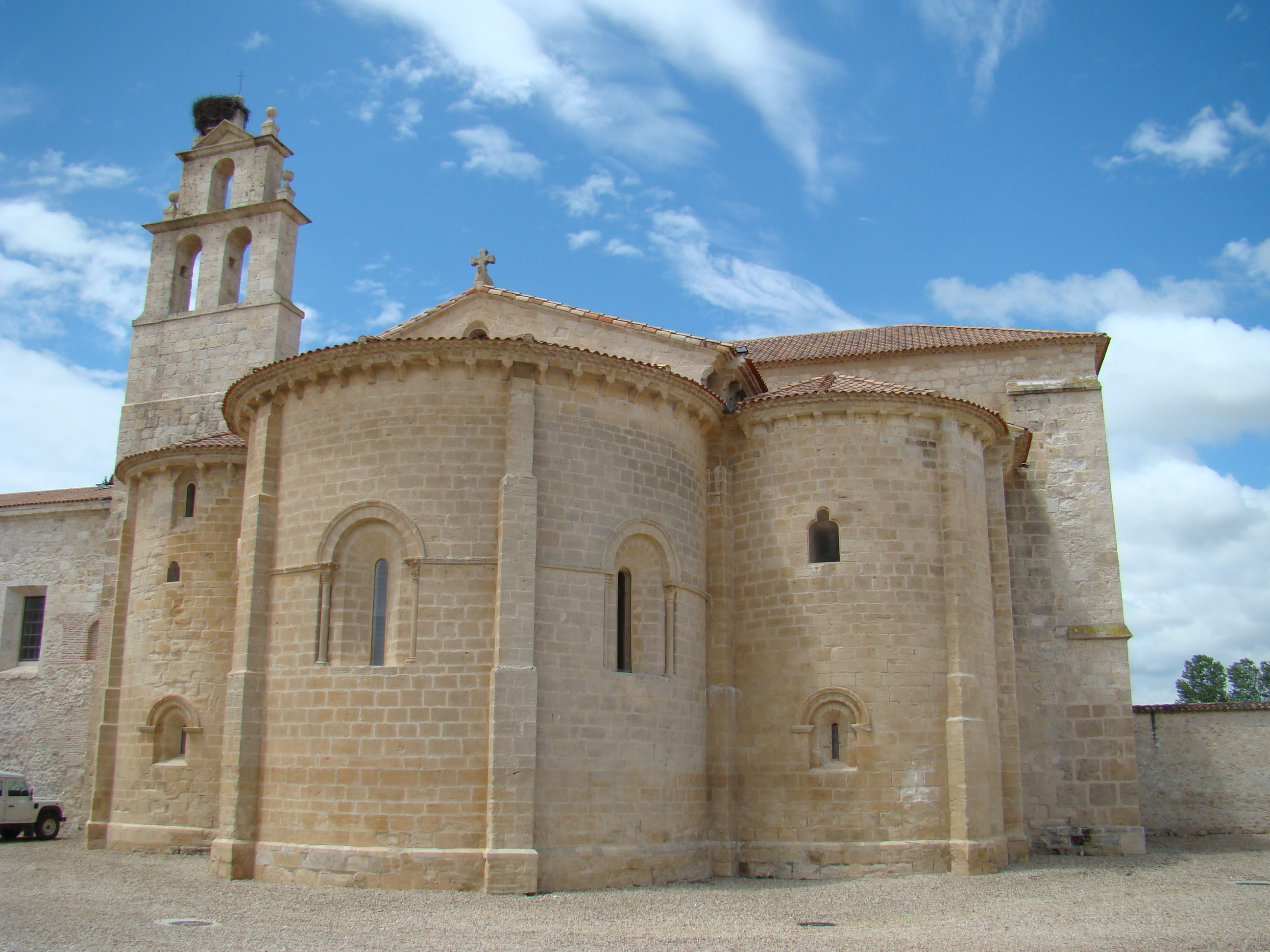
Monastery of Santa María de Retuerta, patronised by members of the House of Castro

He appears confirming many charters in the court and many donations and other family transactions. The Castro brothers confirmed a donation to the Monastery of Santa María de Retuerta made in 1153 by their mother Elo and her second husband Count Ramiro Froilaz . En 1165, Gutierre and his brother Pedro, with the consent of the other brothers, Fernando, Álvaro and Sancha, donated to the above-mentioned monastery the property they shared in Villam Novam in the valley of the Esgueva River. On 29 March, between 1188 and 1218, Gutierre with his wife Elvira and four of their five children, Fernando, García, Pedro and Sancha, jointly with the children of their mother's first marriage, donated the Monastery of San Félix de Incio with all its estates to the Hospitallers. In March 1181, Countess Sancha Fernández de Traba, daughter of Fernando Pérez de Traba, with her two children, Vermudo and Rodrigo Álvarez gave Gutierre, his wife Elvira and son Álvar some land in Lemos. In 1195, Gutierre is attested in the Monastery of Retuerta with his nephews, Fernando and Elo Álvarez, the children of his sister Sancha Rodríguez and her husband Álvaro Rodríguez de Guzmán.

== Marriage and issue ==
Between 18 September 1172 and 12 July of the following year he married Elvira Osorio, daughter of Count Osorio Martínez and Teresa Fernández de Villalobos, widow of the Galician magnate Nuño Fernández with whom she had two children: Munio and Urraca Núñez. In her will, Elvira asked to be buried at that chapel in the Monastery of Sahagún near her maternal grandmother Elvira Alfónsez, illegitimate daughter of King Alfonso VI of León and his mistress Jimena Muñoz. Gutierre and Elvira were the parents of:

- Fernán Gutiérrez de Castro (died c. 1230) married to Milia Íñiguez de Mendoza, (Note: Milia was the daughter of Íñigo López de Mendoza and Maria Garcia. Her sister Inés was one of the mistresses of King Alfonso IX of León with whom she had a daughter, Urraca Alfonso, married to Lope Díaz II de Haro.) was an alférez real y mayordomo mayor. He governed firstly several towns in Tierra de Campos and was later tenant-in-chief of the lands that his father had governed in Galicia. This marriage gave rise to the Galician branch of the House of Castro. One of their sons was Esteban Fernández de Castro.
- García Gutiérrez de Castro
- Pedro Gutiérrez de Castro (died after 1218), mayordomo of the king of Aragon, tenente of the Castle of Algoso and Castrotorafe and, as of 1213, mayordomo mayor of the King of León.
- Álvaro Gutiérrez de Castro (died c. 1213), mayordomo mayor of the King of León in 1211 and governor of Aliste, Castrotorafe, and Villafáfila, he appears for the last time in a charter dated 8 July 1213.
- Sancha Gutiérrez de Castro (died after 1220), the wife of Suero Téllez de Meneses, son of Tello Pérez de Meneses and his wife Gontrodo García. They are the ancestors of the Téllez de Meneses from Toledo.

== Bibliography ==
- Antón y Casaseca, Francisco (1942). Monasterios medievales de la provincia de Valladolid (in Spanish). Valladolid: Librería Santarén. OCLC 8907165.
- Canal Sánchez-Pagín, José M. (1988). "El conde Osorio y los marqueses de Astorga". Astorica: Revista de estudios, documentación, creación y divulgación de temas astorganos (in Spanish) (7): 11–32. ISSN 0212-6141.
- Calderón Medina, Inés (2011). "Las otras mujeres del rey: El concubinato regio en el reino de León (1157- 1230)". Seminário Medieval 2009–2011 (PDF) (in Spanish). Coordinators:Ferreira, María do Rosário; Laranjinha, Ana Sofia; Ribeiro Miranda, José Carlos. Oporto: Instituto de Filosofía da Faculdade de Letras da Universidade do Porto. pp. 255–289. ISBN 9789898459145. Archived from the original (PDF) on 2020-11-20.
- Domínguez Casal, María Mercedes (2004). "Colección documental do Mosteiro de Santa María de Meira". CODOLGA: Corpus Documentale Latinum Gallaeciae (in Spanish) (1). Santiago de Compostela: Centro Ramón Piñeiro para investigación en humanidades. ISSN 1887-5602.
- García Tato, Isidro (2004). Las encomiendas gallegas de la Orden Militar de San Juan de Jerusalén. Estudio y edición documental (in Spanish). Vol. I. Santiago de Compostela: CSIC, Xunta de Galicia, Instituto de Estudios Gallegos «Padre Sarmiento». ISBN 8400082508.
- Salazar y Acha, Jaime de (1991). "El linaje castellano de Castro en el siglo XII: Consideraciones e hipótesis sobre su origen". Anales de la Real Academia Matritense de Heráldica (in Spanish) (1): 33–68. ISSN 1133-1240.
- Sánchez de Mora, Antonio (2003). "La nobleza castellana en la plena Edad Media: el linaje de Lara. Tesis doctoral. Universidad de Sevilla" (in Spanish).
- Torres Sevilla-Quiñones de León, Margarita Cecilia (1999). Linajes nobiliarios de León y Castilla: Siglos IX-XIII (in Spanish). Salamanca: Junta de Castilla y León, Consejería de educación y cultura. ISBN 84-7846-781-5.
