= João Afonso Telo =

João Afonso Telo (or Teles) may refer to one of the following individuals:

- João Afonso Telo de Meneses, 2nd Lord of Albuquerque (died 1268), Portuguese nobleman, Lord of Albuquerque and alferes-mor of King Afonso III of Portugal
- João Afonso Telo, 1st Count of Barcelos (died 1304), also 4th Lord of Albuquerque
- João Afonso Telo, 4th Count of Barcelos (died 1381), Portuguese nobleman, also 1st Count of Ourém
- João Afonso Telo, 1st Count of Viana do Alentejo (died 1384), son of the 4th Count of Barcelos
- João Afonso Telo, 6th Count of Barcelos (died 1385), mayor of Lisbon, admiral of Portugal and brother of Queen Leonor Teles
