= Tello, Cameroon =

Tello
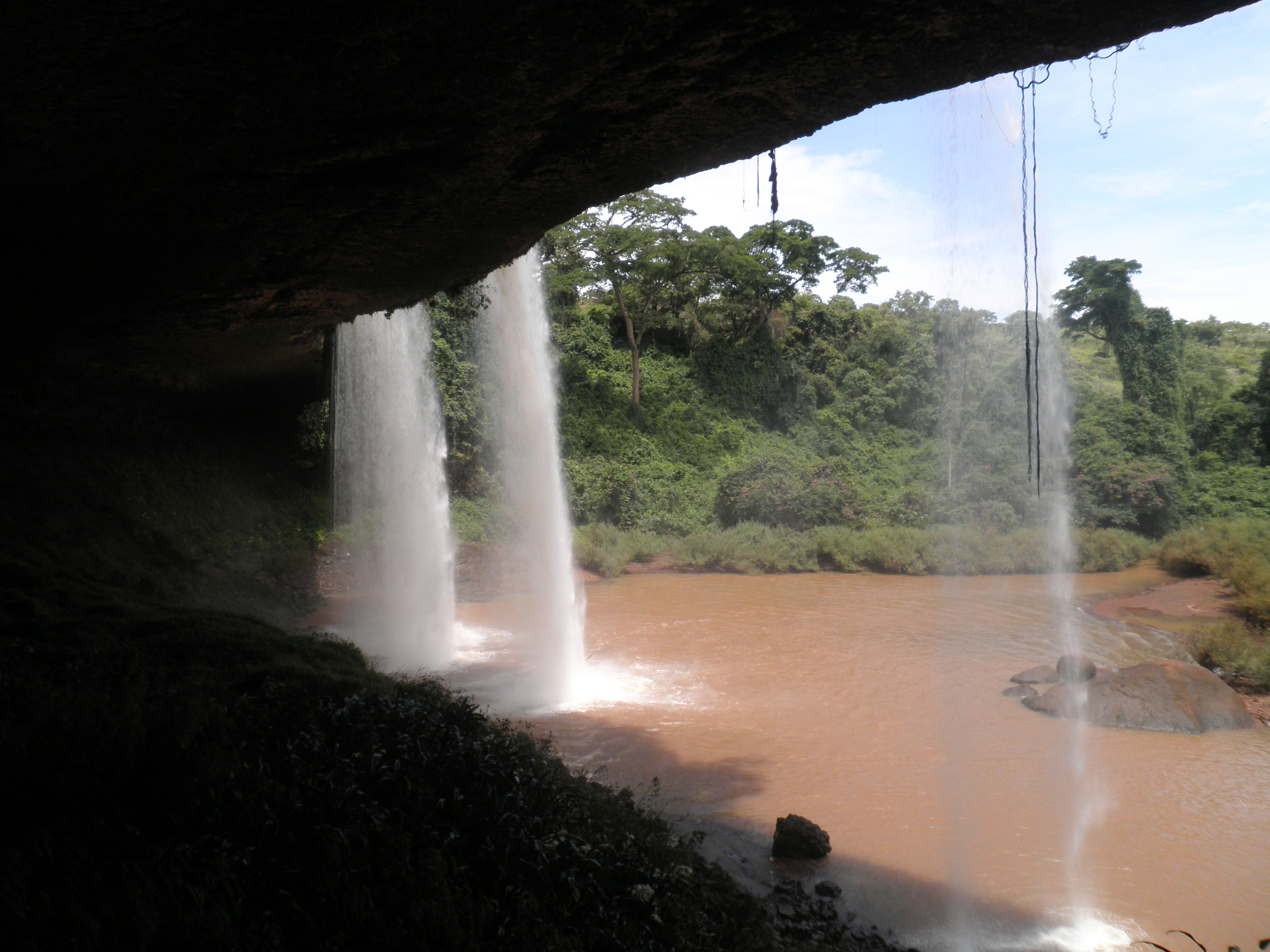
- Tello Waterfalls

- Location within Cameroon
- Coordinates: 7.1667°N 14.1833°E
- Country: Cameroon
- Region: Adamawa
- Department: Vina
- Elevation: 1,532 m (5,026 ft)

Population (2005)
  - Total: 1,659

Tello is a village in the commune of Belel in the Adamawa Region of Cameroon.

== Population ==
At the time of the 2005 census, there were 1659 people in the village.

Views of Tello waterfalls

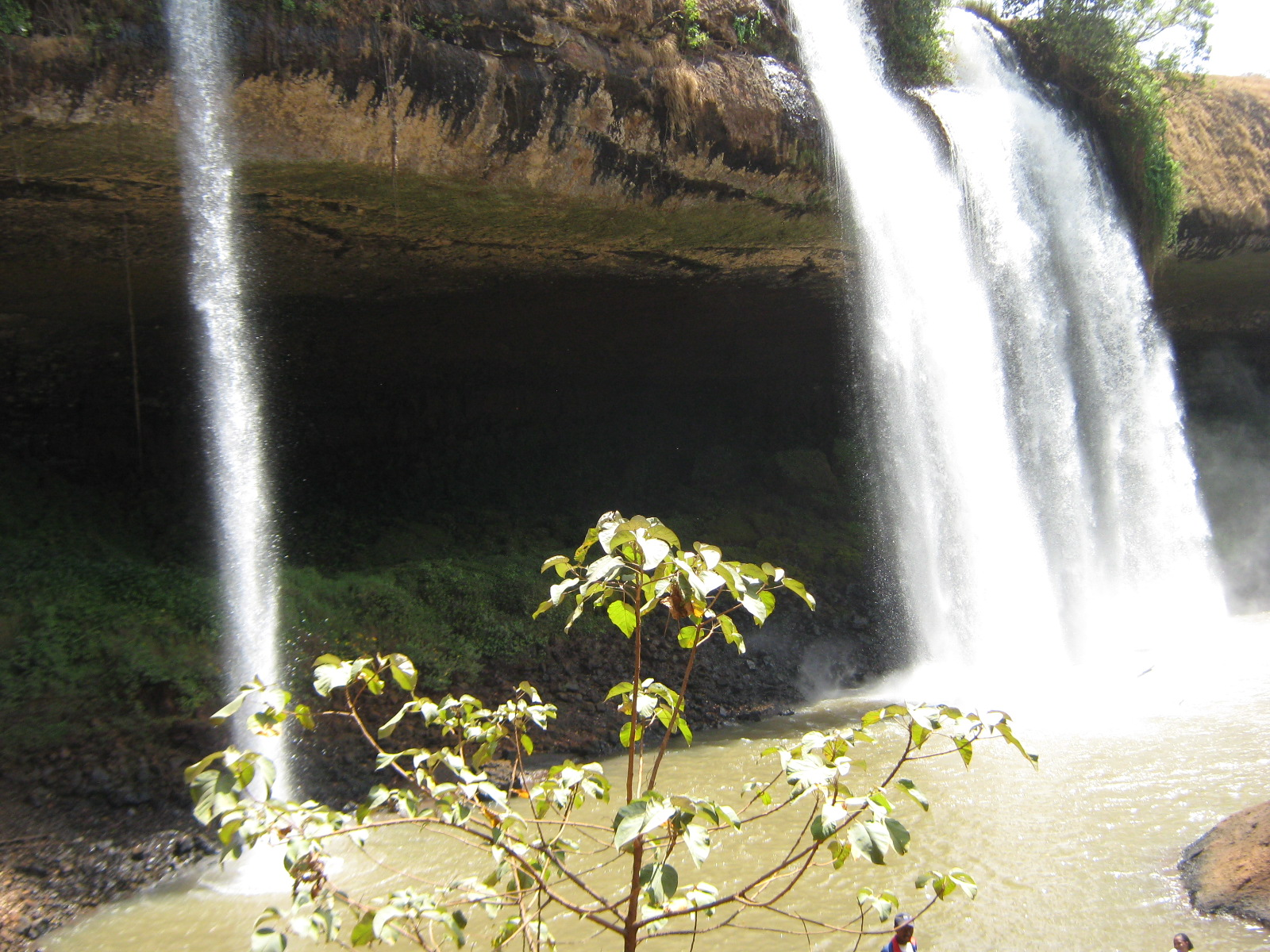

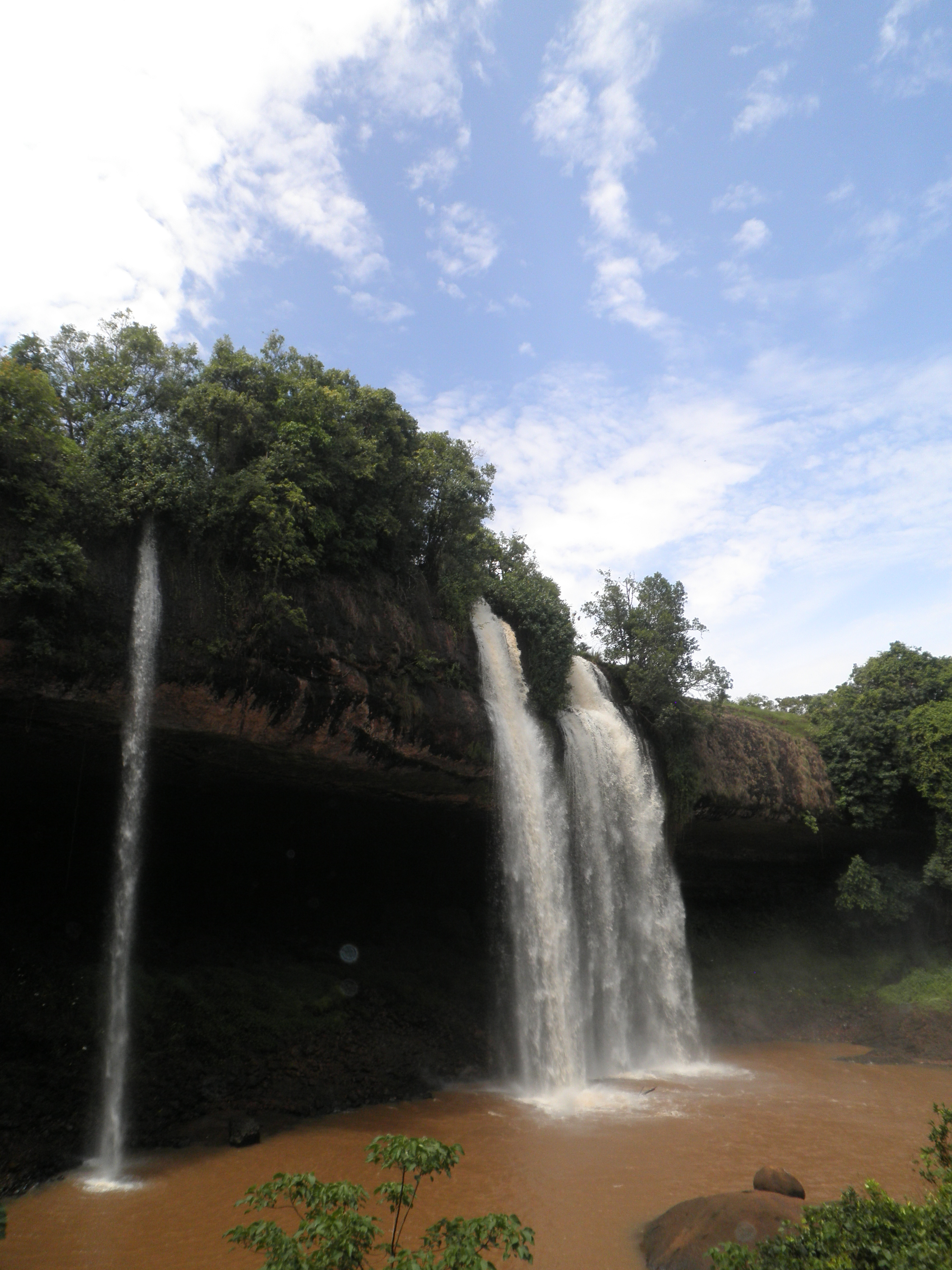

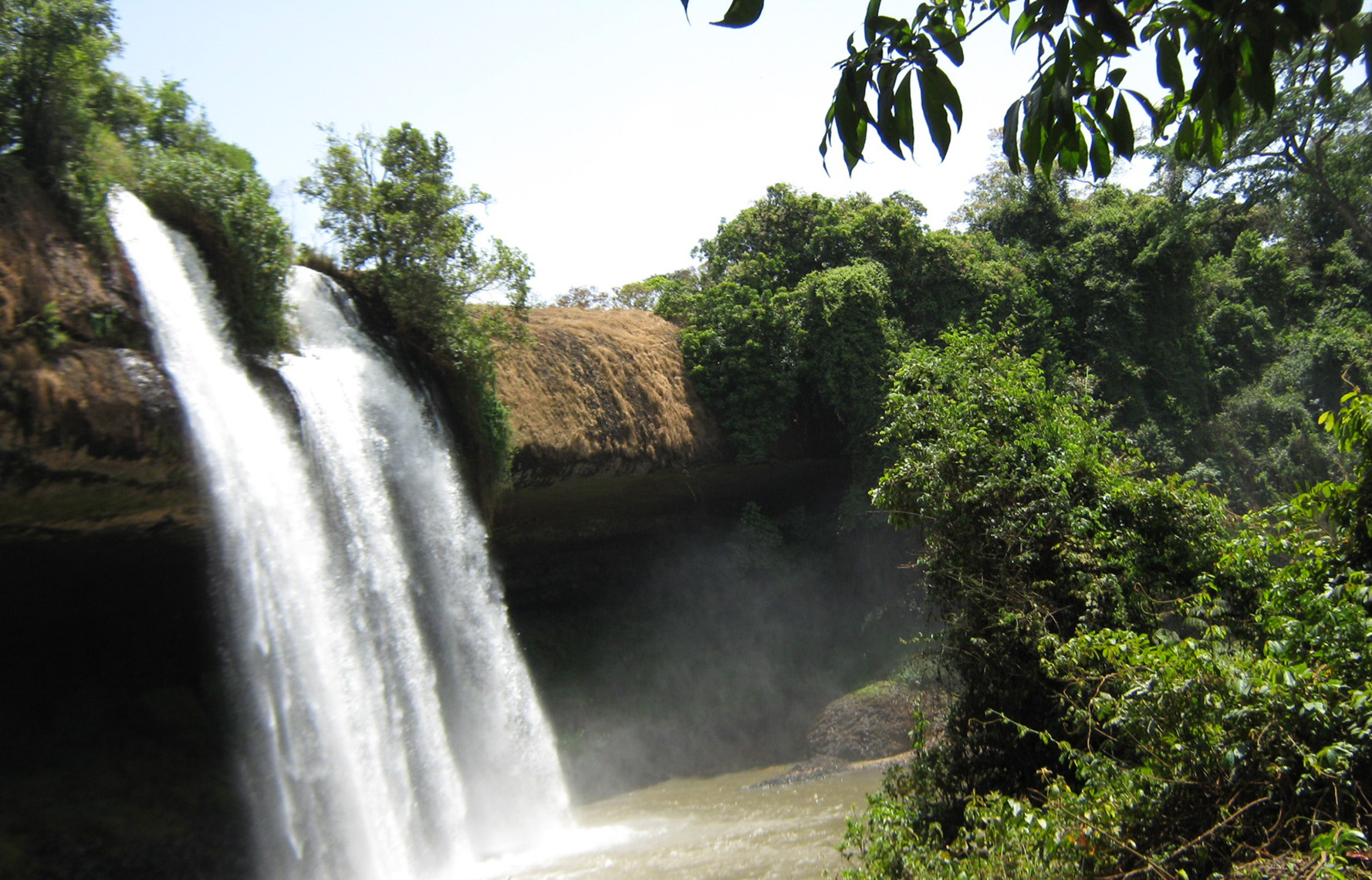

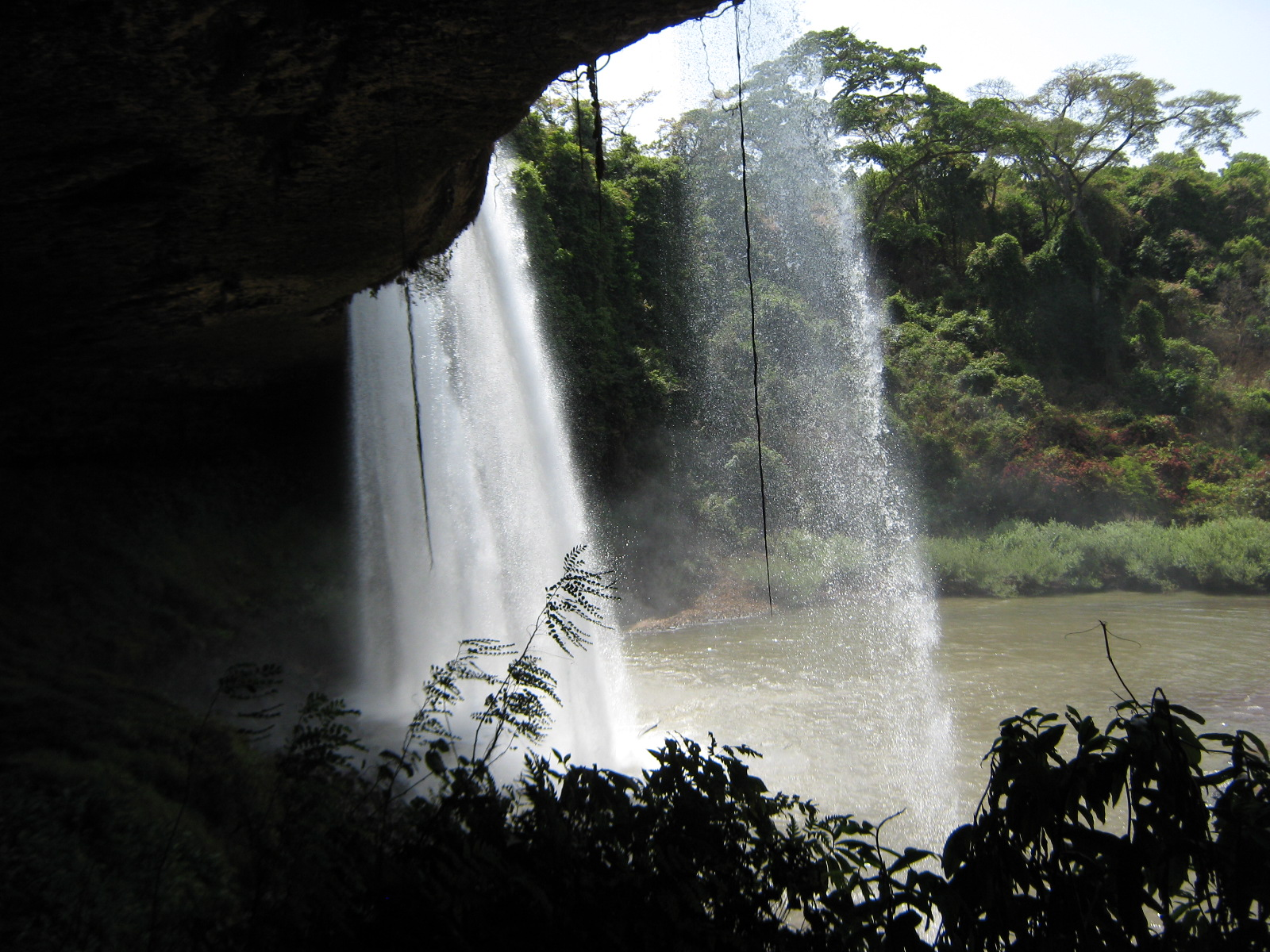

== Bibliography ==
- Jean Boutrais, 1993, Peuples et cultures de l'Adamaoua (Cameroun) : actes du colloque de Ngaoundéré du 14 au 16 janvier 1992, Paris : Éd. de l'ORSTOM u.a.
- Dictionnaire des villages de l'Adamaoua, ONAREST, Yaoundé, October 1974, 133 p.
