= Tela (disambiguation) =

Tela is a municipality in Honduras.

Tela may also refer to:

== Biology and medicine ==
- Tela (from Latin, lit. 'web', used for a web-like layer of tissue, especially a thin reticular membrane)
  - Tela chorioidea, a layer of tissue in the brain
  - Tela subserosa (or just subserosa), a layer of connective tissue between the serosa and the muscular layer in various organs
  - Tela submucosa (or just submucosa), a layer of connective tissue between the mucosa and the muscular layer in various parts of the digestive, respiratory, and genitourinary tracts

== Places ==
- Tela, a Romanian village in Bata, Arad, a commune in Arad County
- Tela River (Río Tela), a river in Honduras

== Other ==
- Television and Entertainment Licensing Authority of Hong Kong, China
- Tela (rapper), an American rap performer from Memphis, Tennessee
- "Tela", a song by the American rock band Phish from the 1987 album The Man Who Stepped into Yesterday

== See also ==
- Thela, a band from New Zealand
- Mr Thela, a South African DJ
- Thella, an ancient Jewish village
- Tola (disambiguation)
- The La's, an English rock band
