= University of Palencia =

First university of Spain

Universidad de Palencia
- El Studium Generale de Palencia
- Established: 1208–1212
- Location: Palencia, Spain

The University of Palencia was the first university of Spain. It was founded by Alfonso VIII at the request of Tello Téllez de Meneses. It was the model upon which the University of Salamanca was patterned.

== History ==
Study began to flourish in Palencia and men notable for their virtue and science came from its schools, among them Julian of Cuenca, Dominic de Guzmán, and Peter González; hence the adage: "En Palencia armas y ciencia" (In Palencia arms and science).

The university was founded about 1212, shortly after the aforesaid victory in the Battle of Navas de Tolosa (others say in 1208), and the king summoned from France and Italy noted teachers of various arts and sciences, retaining them in Palencia on large salaries.

Dominic de Guzmá, the founder of the Dominican Order, regarded Palencia as his alma mater, having been mentored there by Diego de Acebo.

The death of the founder in 1214, the minority of Henry I, and the growth of its fortunate rival, Salamanca, caused the decay of Palencia, many of whose professors and students went to Salamanca, whence the erroneous belief of a transfer of the university to the latter place.

In 1243, Rodrigo Díaz records that in spite of unpropitious events, study continued in Palencia and that the cardinal legate, Juan de Abbeville, in a Council of Valladolid (1228) had endeavoured to revive it. Bishop Fernando obtained from Urban IV (14 May 1263) a Bull granting to the professors and students of Palencia all the privileges of the University of Paris.

But lack of financial support and the proximity of the prosperous University of Salamanca made a revival of Palencia impossible, and it died out before the end of the 13th century, probably in 1264, at which time the university was definitely transferred to Valladolid. It was Bishop Telo who also established convents of the Dominicans and Franciscans.

== See also ==
- University of Valladolid
- List of medieval universities
