= Fresno del Río =

- municipality
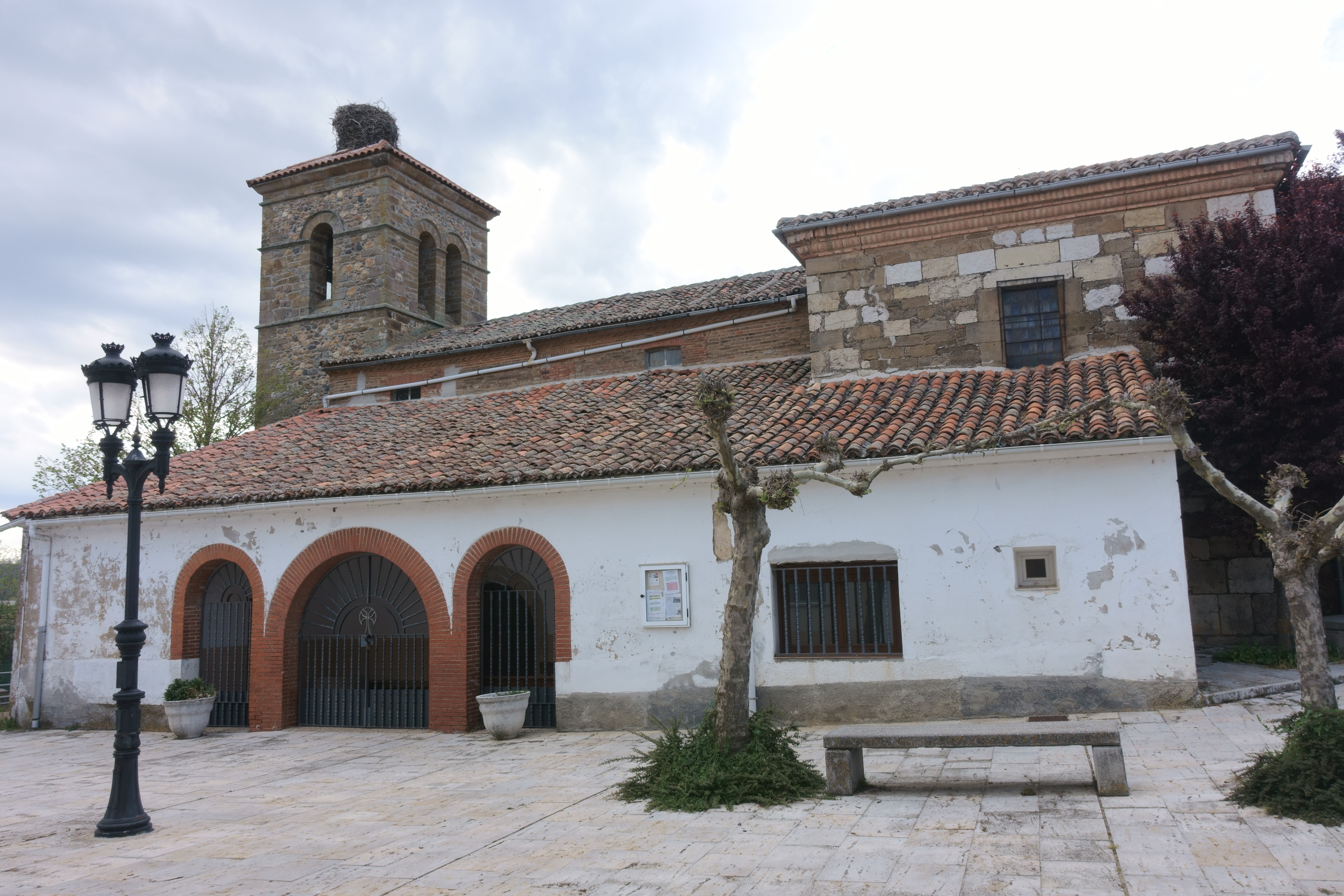

- Flag Coat of arms
- Interactive map of Fresno del Río
- Coordinates: 42°40′55″N 4°49′1″W
- Country: Spain
- Autonomous community: Castile and León
- Province: Palencia
- Municipality: Fresno del Río

Area
  - Total: 43 km^{2} (17 sq mi)

Population (2025-01-01)
  - Total: 169
  - Density: 3.9/km^{2} (10/sq mi)
- Time zone: UTC+1 (CET)
  - Summer (DST): UTC+2 (CEST)
- Website: Official website

Fresno del Río is a municipality located in the province of Palencia, Castile and León, Spain. According to the 2004 census (INE), the municipality has a population of 190 inhabitants.
