= Tello Téllez de Meneses =

Spanish bishop (1170–1246)

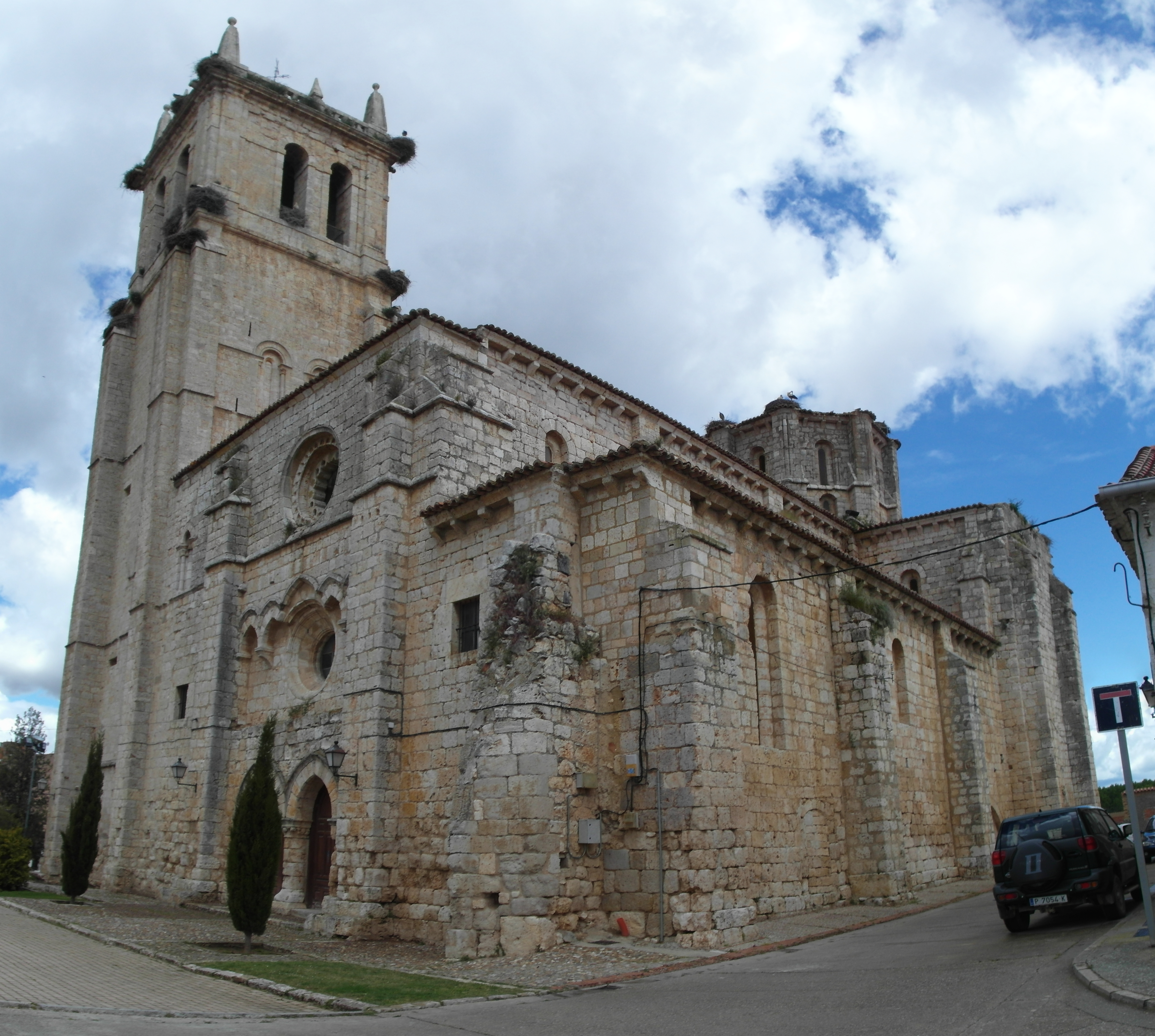
Fortified church of Villamuriel, built under Tello

Tello Téllez de Meneses (c.1170 – 1246) was the bishop of Palencia from 1208 until his death. He was a member of a prominent family from Meneses in the Tierra de Campos. His father was Tello Pérez de Meneses; his mother, Gontrodo García, founders of the monastery of Santa María de Matallana. A Palencian cultural institute, the Institución Tello Téllez de Meneses, bears his name.

In 1208, with the support of King Alfonso VIII of Castile, Tello founded the University of Palencia as a studium generale, a place of general study. He protected the friar and itinerant preacher Pedro González Telmo and offered to admit him to the university.

In 1212, he joined his secular brothers, Alfonso Téllez, Suero Téllez and García Téllez, at the head of a body of troops in the Battle of Las Navas de Tolosa, a major victory for Castile and its allies over the Almohads.

In 1215–16, he attended the Fourth Lateran Council, a general synod of the Roman Catholic Church.

During his episcopate, the fortified church and palace of Villamuriel de Cerrato were built.

He died at Jaén after an episcopate of 38 years.

== Bibliography ==
- Barón Faraldo, Andrés (2006). Grupos y dominios aristocráticos en la Tierra de Campos oriental, Siglos X–-XIII (in Spanish). Palencia: Monografías. ISBN 84-8173-122-6.
- Rodríguez Salcedo, Severino (1949). "Memorias de don Tello Téllez de Meneses". Publicaciones de la Institución Tello Téllez de Meneses. ISSN 0210-7317.
- Salcedo Tapia, Modesto (1985). "Vida de don Tello Téllez de Meneses, obispo de Palencia". Publicaciones de la Institución Tello Téllez de Meneses. ISSN 0210-7317.
- Salcedo Tapia, Modesto (1999). La familia Téllez de Meneses en los tronos de Castilla y Portugal (in Spanish). Palencia: Institución Tello Téllez de Meneses. ISBN 848173-070-X.

Preceded by Arderico	Bishop of Palencia; 1208–1246	Succeeded by Rodrigo
