= Montealegre de Campos =

Montealegre de Campos, Spain
- Flag Coat of arms

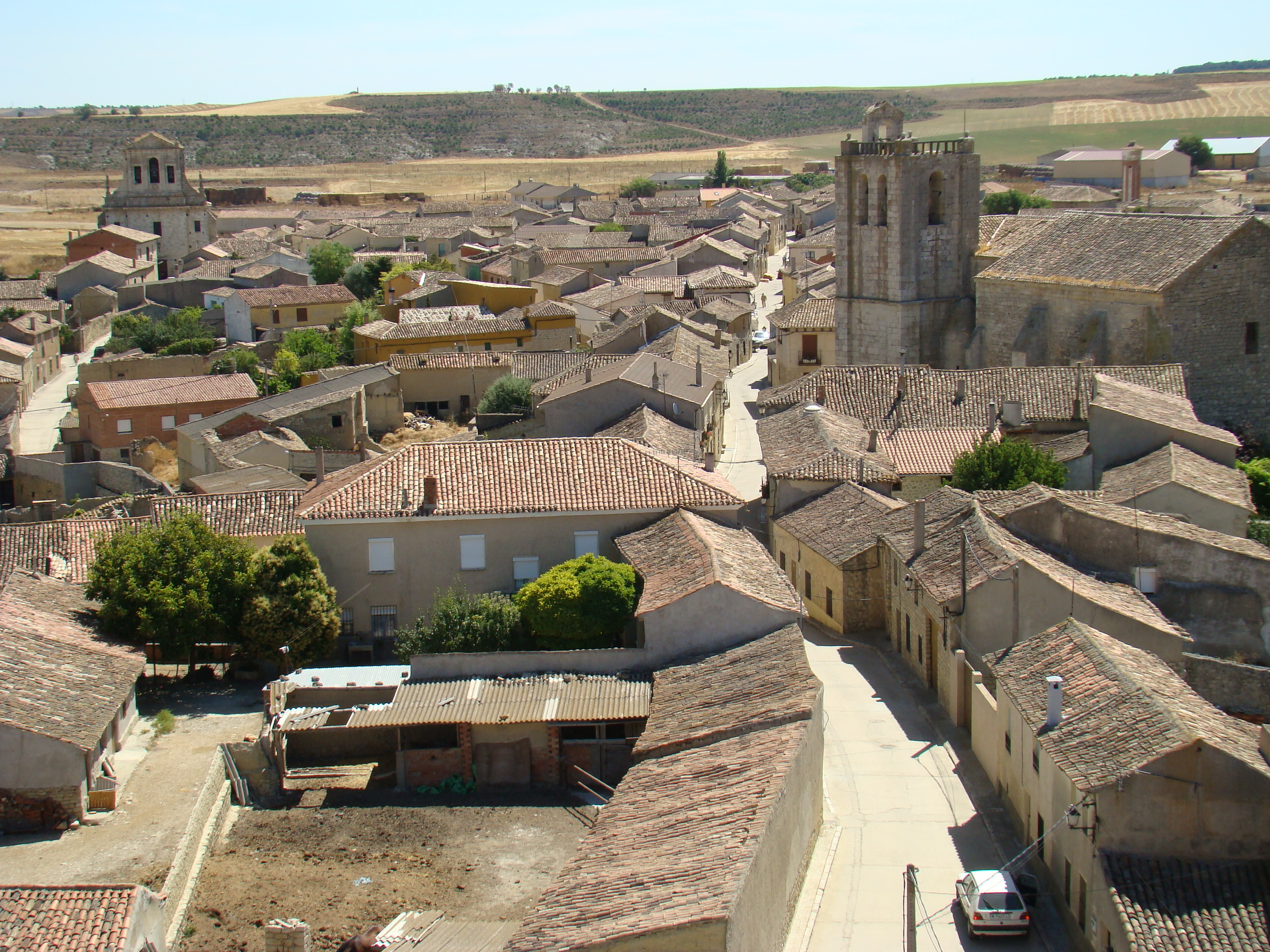
- Panoramic view.
- Coordinates: 41.9025°N 4.8997°W
- Country: Spain
- Autonomous community: Castile and León
- Province: Valladolid
- Municipality: Montealegre de Campos

Area
  - Total: 34 km^{2} (13 sq mi)

Population (2025-01-01)
  - Total: 105
  - Density: 3.1/km^{2} (8.0/sq mi)
- Time zone: UTC+1 (CET)
  - Summer (DST): UTC+2 (CEST)

Montealegre de Campos is a municipality located in the province of Valladolid, Castile and León, Spain. According to the 2004 census (INE), the municipality has a population of 135 inhabitants.

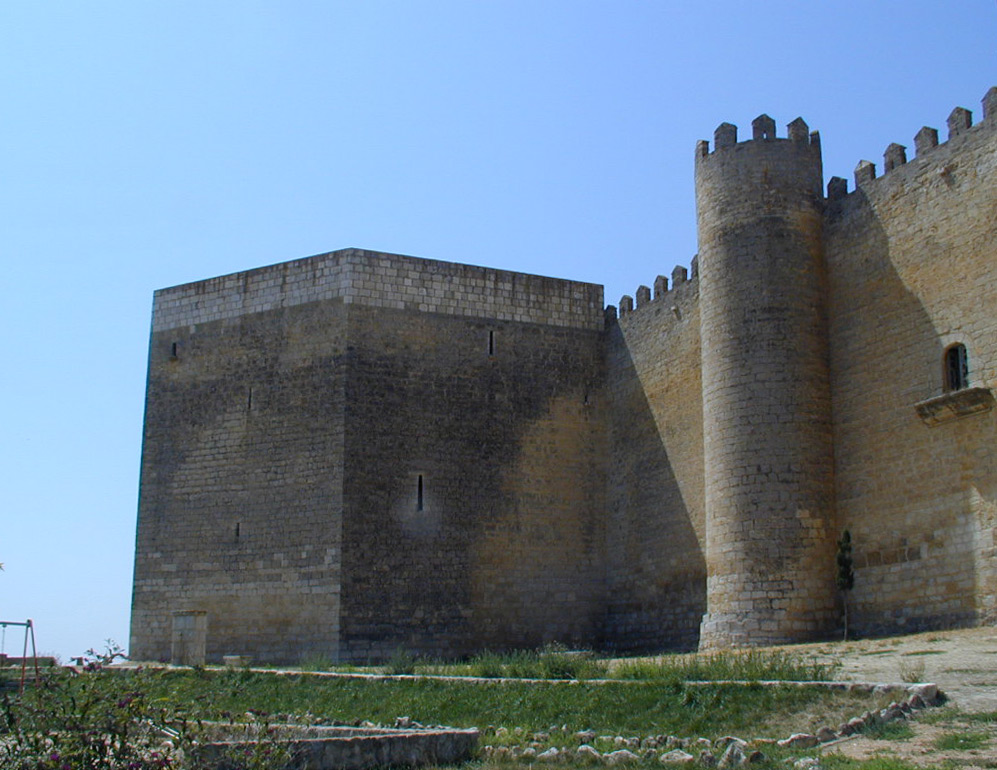
Castle of Montealegre de Campos.

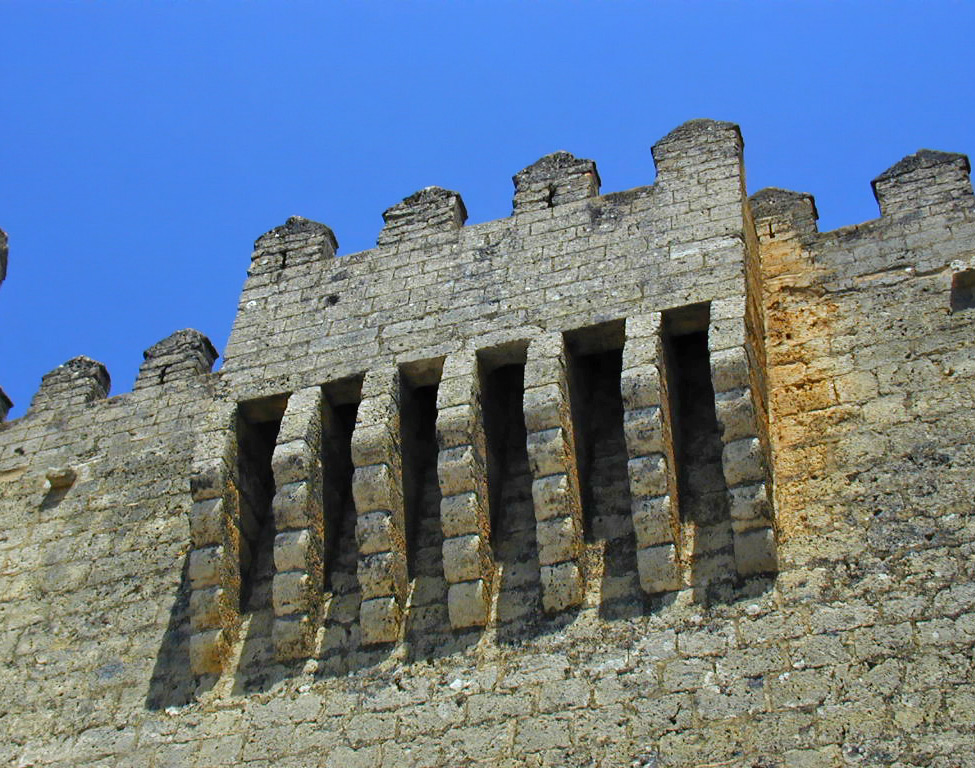
Detail of the castle.
