= University Reform Act (Spain) =

1983 Spanish law reforming higher education

The University Reform Act (Spanish: Ley de Reforma Universitaria, abbreviated LRU) was a Spanish law promoted by Socialist Education Minister José María Maravall and the PSOE under Felipe González in 1983. Officially titled Organic Law 11/1983, of August 25, on University Reform, commonly known as the University Reform Law, it was in effect from 1983 until January 13, 2002, when the Organic Law of Universities (Spain) (Ley Orgánica de Universidades, LOU) came into force.

== Overview ==
The University Reform Law aimed to modernize a university system inherited from the Francoist regime, which had been governed solely by the University System Law of 1943. The law initiated a comprehensive overhaul, starting with the modernization and, in some cases, democratization of curricula. It reduced the duration of bachelor's degrees (licenciaturas) to four years and engineering degrees to five years, while promoting three-year diplomas (diplomaturas) and technical engineering degrees. (Note: Art. 30. University studies shall be structured in a maximum of three cycles. Successful completion of the first cycle shall entitle the student to obtain a Diploma in Technical Architecture or Technical Engineering; successful completion of the second cycle shall entitle the student to obtain a Bachelor's Degree in Architecture or Engineering; and successful completion of the third cycle shall entitle the student to obtain a Doctorate. Where appropriate, the conditions for validation or adaptation for progression from one cycle to another shall be established.) It also introduced pathways between degrees, including access to second-cycle-only programs (3+2 structure). Through subsequent regulations, the law facilitated "transversality," enabling student mobility across programs via a credit system, where one credit equaled 10 hours of instruction.

In terms of university organization, the LRU established a model centered on departments and multi-degree academic centers. It created competitive examination boards for faculty appointments, consisting of three members selected by lottery and two appointed by the university, reinforcing the university community's right to academic autonomy.

Article 11 of the law opened opportunities for professional consultancy and encouraged academic staff to engage in consulting and research. Article 46-2 enabled universities to evaluate faculty performance in teaching, research, and administration individually.

== Historical context ==
The political program of the governments led by Felipe González was a project of "modernization" to align Spanish society with other advanced democratic societies. Its historical reference was the moderate socialism of Indalecio Prieto. Despite an ambitious agenda, the PSOE aimed to consolidate democracy, address the economic crisis—promising to create 800,000 jobs—and enhance the efficiency and competitiveness of productive structures while promoting a fairer and more equitable society through universal healthcare, education, and pensions. As historian Santos Juliá noted, the PSOE sought to "change everything without revolutionizing anything" within a "project of state and societal regeneration," encapsulated in Felipe González's slogan, "Let Spain work."

However, the economic and political situation inherited from the Leopoldo Calvo-Sotelo government was challenging. Economic stagnation persisted, with unemployment exceeding 16%, inflation above 15%, and a runaway budget deficit. ETA terrorism continued, and the threat of a coup remained, as evidenced by the attempted coup on October 27, 1982, which the Calvo-Sotelo government thwarted just before the October 28 elections.

== Academic staff ==
A key aspect of the University Reform Law was the restructuring of academic staff categories. The law maintained the historical distinction between Faculties and Higher Schools (five-year programs) and University or Technical Schools (three-year programs), establishing two main categories for each: (Note: Art. 33. 1. University teaching staff shall consist of teaching staff from the following bodies: a) University professors. b) University lecturers. c) University college professors. d) University college lecturers.)

- University Professors (Catedráticos de Universidad).
- University Associate Professors (Profesores Titulares de Universidad).
- University School Professors (Catedráticos de Escuelas Universitarias).
- University School Associate Professors (Profesores Titulares de Escuelas Universitarias).

Advancement between categories required a specific competitive examination. However, the LRU's transitional provisions allowed for the integration of existing academic staff categories (numerary professors, including Full Professors, Associate Professors, and Assistant Professors, as well as non-numerary contracted or interim staff, known as PNN) if they met certain criteria. Numerary Associate Professors were integrated into the University or University School Professor categories, while Assistant Professors joined the Associate Professor categories. This integration sparked significant debate in the Congress of Deputies, leading many Socialist deputies and senior officials to forgo transitioning to full professor status via these provisions.

While numerary staff integration was automatic, non-numerary staff (PNN) required a suitability test (idoneidad). Those with five years of service and a doctoral degree obtained before July 1983 were integrated into the University Associate Professor category. Those without a doctorate by that date joined the University School Associate Professor category. (Note: Art. 9, para. 2: "Within six months of the publication of this Law, the Ministry of Education and Science shall organize aptitude tests for admission to the category of Associate University Professor, in which professors who, on September 30, 1983, had completed five academic years of university teaching or research, and who, on July 10, 1983, held a doctoral degree and were working as temporary or contract employees at the levels of Associate Professor, as regulated by Ministerial Order of October 21, 1982, Adjunct Professor, or University Professor. The conditions for these examinations shall be established in the call for applications. Those who pass this test, which will assess the teaching and research abilities as well as the academic record of the candidates, will be appointed as tenured university professors at the university where they were working as contract or temporary employees.)

== Contracted academic staff ==
The law capped contracted academic staff at 20% of total positions. To facilitate career progression, it introduced the Associate Professor role, designed for professionals or secondary school teachers with a doctorate, teaching a maximum of 3–6 credits. (Note: Organic Law 11/1983 of August 25, p. 2: “At the same time, an effort has been made to reduce the bureaucracy of the legal regime governing such teaching staff, not only through the creation of the positions of associate professor and visiting professor, but also through the creation of a specific statute for teaching civil servants.”)

== Bibliography ==
- Juliá, Santos (1999). Un siglo de España. Política y sociedad [A Century of Spain: Politics and Society] (in Spanish). Madrid: Marcial Pons. ISBN 84-9537903-1.
- Ruiz, David (2002). La España democrática (1975-2000). Política y sociedad [Democratic Spain (1975-2000): Politics and Society] (in Spanish). Madrid: Síntesis. ISBN 84-9756-015-9.
- Tusell, Javier (1997). La transición española. La recuperación de las libertades [The Spanish Transition: The Recovery of Freedoms] (in Spanish). Madrid: Historia 16-Temas de Hoy. ISBN 84-7679-327-8.
