= Alfonso Téllez de Meneses el Viejo =

Castilian noble

Alfonso Téllez de Meneses (c. 1161–1230), known as el Viejo ("the Old"), was a nobleman of Castile and a participant in the key Reconquista battle of Las Navas de Tolosa. He was the second Lord of Meneses, Lord of Cea, Grajal, Montalbán, and, through his second wife, first Lord of Alburquerque.

== Family ==
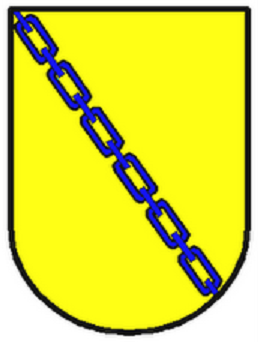
Coat of arms of the Téllez de Meneses family: Or, a chain in bend azure.

His father was Tello Pérez de Meneses, a powerful noble in Tierra de Campos and Cea, founder, with his wife Gontrodo, of the Monastery of Santa María de Matallana, and three hospitals for lepers and pilgrims in Cuenca, Villamartín, and in San Nicolás del Real Camino. Although mistakenly considered the founders of the Monastery of Santa María de Trianos because of the donation that the couple made in 1185 with the consent of their five children, the monastery had been founded before 1125 the year in which Pope Honorius II issued a Papal bull appointing the abbot and the prior of this religious establishment.

The mother of Alfonso Téllez de Meneses was Gontrodo García of the Fláinez family who married Tello Pérez de Meneses around 1161, the year in which he granted her arras. Gontrodo was the daughter of García Pérez, tenente in Cea who distinguished himself in the conquest of Baeza and Almería, and of Teresa Pérez. Gontrodo's parents founded the Cistercian convent of Santa María la Real in Gradefes, which she joined after she was widowed and where she eventually became the abbess.

== Life ==
In 1209 King Alfonso VIII ceded to Alfonso Téllez de Meneses the village of Montalbán. The following year he received as a gift of the king the village of Navahermosa, its castle Dos Hermanas, and the village of Malamoneda and its eponymous castle, splitting them off from the jurisdiction of the Knights Templar. Around this time Alfonso Téllez de Meneses also governed Portillo on behalf of his relative Ermengol VIII, Count of Urgell.

He fought at the Battle of Las Navas de Tolosa, which took place on 16 July 1212, along with his brothers-in-law Gonzalo, Rodrigo, Pedro, Nuño, and Álvaro Rodríguez Girón, and his three brothers.

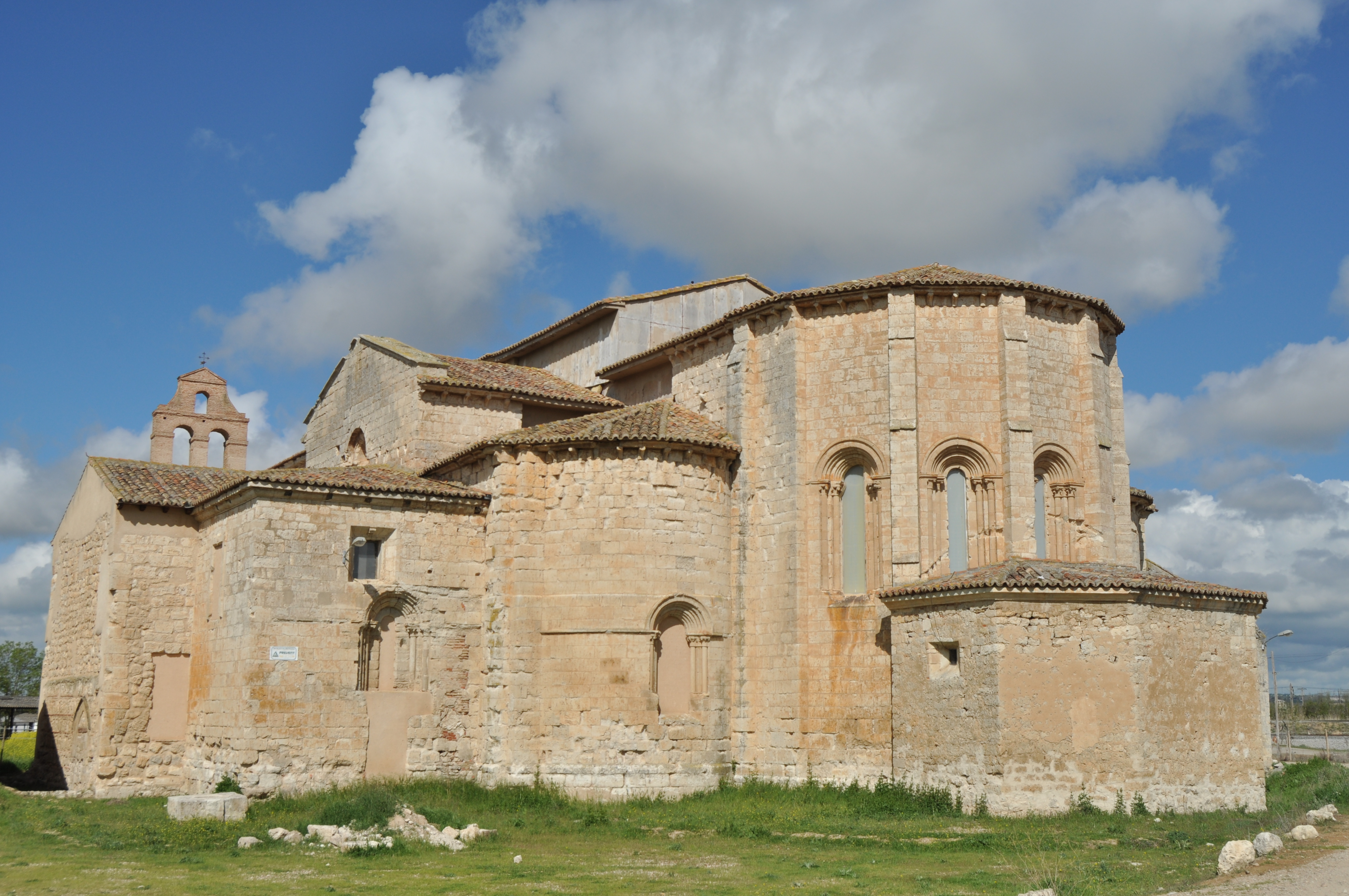
Monastery of Santa María de Palazuelos (Corcos del Valle, Province of Valladolid), founded by Alfonso Téllez de Meneses, who, according to tradition, was laid to rest here. Some of his descendants are buried here, including Mayor Alfonso de Meneses, mother of Queen María de Molina.

In July 1213 Alfonso VIII ceded the village of Palazuelos to Alfonso Téllez de Meneses and he in turn donated it to a Cistercian community, specifically that of San Andrés de Valbení. In 1216 construction began on the Romanesque Monastery of Palazuelos. It was completed in the middle of the 13th century and became the headquarters of the Cistercians of Castile.

In February 1216, during the uprising of Álvaro Núñez de Lara, he took part in an extraordinary parliament along with other Castilian nobles including Lope Díaz de Haro, Gonzalo Rodríguez Girón, Álvaro Díaz de Cameros, and others, where they agreed, with the support of Berengaria (sister of the young king Henry I), to form a common front against Álvaro Núñez. By the end of May the situation in Castile had become dangerous for Berengaria, so she decided to take refuge in the castle of Autillo de Campos, a property of Gonzalo Rodríguez Girón, and sent her son Fernando to the court of León and his father, King Alfonso IX. On 15 August 1216 a meeting was held among all the nobility of the Kingdom of Castile to try to reach an accord and avoid civil war, but their disagreements led the families of Girón, Téllez de Meneses, and Haro distance themselves definitively from Álvaro Núñez de Lara.

According to the Crónica latina de los reyes de Castilla, the year 1217 was one of great tension, such as never had occurred in Castile before. Álvaro Núñez de Lara refused to renounce the power he had gained thereto and harassed the forces that remained loyal to Berengaria, laying waste to the valley of Trigueros and besieging Autillo de Campos, where Berengaria and her partisans were located, as well as Cisneros and Frechilla.

Circumstances changed suddenly when King Henry died on 6 June 1217 after receiving a head wound from a roof tile that came loose accidentally while he was playing with other children in the palace of the Bishop of Palencia, Tello Téllez de Meneses. Álvaro Núñez de Lara, as the young king's guardian, tried to keep the matter quiet, bringing the king's body to the castle of Tariego, but he could not prevent the news from reaching Queen Berengaria.

Immediately, Berengaria charged Lope Díaz de Haro, Gonzalo Rodríguez Girón, and Alfonso Téllez de Meneses with the task of discreetly fetching her son Ferdinand, who at the time was in Toro with his father King Alfonso, using as pretext the possibility of an attack on Autillo and without revealing the news of her brother's death. Despite the hesitation of the infantas Sancha and Dulce, the nobles were able to convince the King that King Henry was alive and well, thereupon leaving Toro with Ferdinand. Berengaria, the legitimate heiress to the throne of Castile, renounced it in favor of her son Ferdinand, who shortly thereafter was proclaimed king in Autillo de Campos on 14 June 1217.

On 20 September of that year, Alfonso Téllez de Meneses took Álvaro Núñez de Lara prisoner, and Álvaro was obliged to hand over some fortresses. On 11 November a generous truce was signed, allowing members of the House of Lara to recover their liberty and privileges. As soon as he was released from prison, however, Álvaro once again defied his enemies Alfonso Téllez de Meneses, Gonzalo Rodríguez Girón, and Lope Díaz de Haro, but he died while laying siege to them in the fortress of Castrejón de Trabancos, where they had taken refuge after an initial defeat. His brother Fernando Núñez de Lara made his way to Morocco, where he placed himself in the service of Caliph Yusuf II. The Pact of Toro of 26 August 1218 ratified the truce and put an end to the conflict.

Alfonso Téllez de Meneses died in 1230 while accompanying King Ferdinand on his way to his coronation as King of León, the occasion of the union of the two crowns upon the death of Alfonso IX of León. He was buried, according to tradition, in the Monastery of Santa María de Palazuelos which he had founded.

== Marriage and children ==
Alfonso married twice. His first wife was Elvira Rodríguez Girón (? – after 22 February 1211), daughter of Rodrigo Gutiérrez Girón. They had four children:

- Tello Alfonso de Meneses, subject of chivalric romances on account of his defense of Martos and Córdoba. He died without issue, leaving his brother Alfonso to succeed him as Governor of Cordoba and Lord of Meneses.
- Alfonso Téllez de Meneses "el Mozo", ("the Young"; ? – c. 1257), who married María Anes de Limia, daughter of Juan Fernández, tenant-in-chief in Limia y Monterroso, and Maria Pais Ribeira "a Ribeirinha". Alfonso and María had three children, including, Mayor Alfonso de Meneses, the wife of infante Alfonso de Molina, and mother of Queen María de Molina and her brother Alfonso Téllez de Molina, Lord of Meneses and alférez to the king.
- Mayor Alfonso, married to Rodrigo Gómez de Traba, son of Count Gómez González de Traba and Elvira Pérez.
- Teresa Alfonso, married to Menendo González de Sousa, and by him the mother of María Méndez de Sousa who married Martín Alfonso, illegitimate son of Alfonso IX of León and Teresa Gil de Soverosa.

Between February 1211, the year in which his first wife died, and before July 1213 when he first appears with his second wife, he married the young Portuguese Teresa Sanches, the illegitimate daughter of Sancho I of Portugal and Maria Pais Ribeira, who later married Juan Fernández, tenant-in-chief in Limia and Monterroso. Alfonso probably succeeded to the Lordship of Alburquerque thanks to his second marriage to Teresa, since it was inherited by the children of this marriage, while the Lordship of Meneses passed to his firstborn, Tello, the son of his first wife. The children of this second marriage were:

- Martín Alfonso (died after 15 June 1285), who married Mencia Rodríguez. Martín left a will dated 15 June 1285, leaving instructions for his wife Mencia, his sister María Alfonso, and his five children, Teresa, María, Alfonso, Velasco, and Gil Martínez. He also mentions his brother-in-law Gómez Rodríguez who must be Mencía's brother.
- Alfonso Alfonso de Meneses "Tizón", (died after 1252), who according to some authors married Mayor González Girón, daughter of Gonzalo Rodríguez Girón.
- María Alfonso (died before 15 June 1285).
- Juan Alfonso (?–1268), married to Elvira or Berenguela González Girón, daughter of Gonzalo Rodríguez Girón.

== Bibliography ==
- Alonso Álvarez, Raquel (2007). "Los promotores de la Orden del Císter en los reinos de Castilla y León: Familias aristocráticas y damas nobles". Anuario de Estudios Medievales (in Spanish). 37 (37/2): 653–710. doi:10.3989/aem.2007.v37.i2.50. hdl:10651/21710. ISSN 0066-5061.
- Ara Gil, Julia (2001). "El Monasterio de Santa María de Palazuelos: un frágil testimonio del pasado" (PDF). Boletín de la Real Academia de Bellas Artes de la Purísima Concepción (in Spanish) (36). Valladolid, Spain: Real Academia de Bellas Artes de la Purísima Concepción. ISSN 1132-0788. Archived from the original (PDF) on 2013-09-28.
- Ara Gil, Clementina Julia (September 2009). "Monasterio de Santa María de Matallana" (PDF). Argaya: Revista de Cultura (in Spanish). Diputación de Valladolid: 7–24. Archived from the original (PDF) on 2013-09-27.
- Arce, Jordi Gibert. "Cronología histórica". Archived from the original on October 15, 2011.
- Barón Faraldo, Andrés (2006). Grupos y dominios aristocráticos en la Tierra de Campos oriental, Siglos X-XIII. Palencia: Monografías. ISBN 84-8173-122-6.
- Calvo, Aurelio (1945). El Monasterio de Gradefes: Apuntes para su histora y la de algunos otros cenobios y pueblos del Concejo (in Spanish). León: Imprenta Provincial. OCLC 4156821.
- Castán Lanaspa, Guillermo; Castán Lanaspa, Javier (1992). Documentos del Monasterio de Santa María de Trianos (Siglos XII-XIII) (in Spanish). Salamanca: Ediciones Universidad de Salamanca. ISBN 84-7481-713-7.
- Castán Lanaspa, Guillermo (1984). "San Nicolás del Real Camino: Un hospital de leprosos castellano-leonés en la Edad Media" (PDF). Publicaciones de la Institución Tello Téllez de Meneses (in Spanish) (51). ISSN 0210-7317.
- Estepa Díez, Carlos (2003). Las Behetrías Castellanas, Vol. I. Junta de Castilla y León, Consejería de Cultura y Turismo. ISBN 84-9718-117-4.
- Lodo de Mayoralgo, José Miguel (1985). "Los Blázquez de Cáceres, los Mayoralgos, y los Ovandos: estudio crítico sobre su origen y genealogía (siglos XIII al XV)". Estudios genealógicos y heráldicos (in Spanish) (1). Madrid: Asociación española de estudios genealógicos y heráldicos. ISBN 84-398-3591-4.
- "Monasterio de Palazuelos" (in Spanish). Arteguías.
- Rochwert-Zuili, Patricia, ed. (2010). "Crónica de Castilla". Les livres d'e-Spania. Sources (in Spanish). Paris: Revues.org & SEMH-Sorbonne. doi:10.4000/books.esb.63. ISBN 978-2-919448-07-4. ISSN 2109-8972.
- Rodríguez Salcedo, Severino (1949). "Memorias de don Tello Téllez de Meneses". Publicaciones de la Institución Tello Téllez de Meneses (1). Palencia, Spain: Institución Tello Téllez de Meneses: 13–38. ISSN 0210-7317.
- Ruiz Gómez, Francisco (2003). Los orígenes de las órdenes militares y la repoblación de los territorios de La Mancha (1150-1250). Consejo Superior de Investigaciones Científicas. ISBN 84-00-08159-5.
- Salcedo Tapia, Modesto (1985). "La vida de don Tello Téllez de Meneses, obispo de Palencia". Publicaciones de la Institución Tello Téllez de Meneses (in Spanish) (53). Palencia, Spain: Institución Tello Téllez de Meneses. ISSN 0210-7317.
- Salcedo Tapia, Modesto (1999). La familia Téllez de Meneses en los tronos de Castilla y Portugal (in Spanish). Palencia: Institución Tello Téllez de Meneses CECEL-CSIC, y Diputación de Palencia, Departamento de Cultura. ISBN 848173-070-X.
- Sánchez de Mora, Antonio (2003). La nobleza castellana en la plena Edad Media: el linaje de Lara (SS. XI–XIII) (Ph.D.) (in Spanish). Universidad de Sevilla.
- Torres Sevilla-Quiñones de León, Margarita (1999). Linajes nobiliarios de León y Castilla. Salamanca: Junta de Castilla y León. ISBN 84-7846-781-5.
- Vara Thorbeck, Carlos (2005). "Historia medieval de la Villa de Portillo". Arbor. 181 (714): 163–169. doi:10.3989/arbor.2005.i714.424.
