= Castrillo =

Castrillo may refer to:

People

- Carlos Castrillo (born 1985), football player
- Demetrio Alonso Castrillo (1841–1916), politician and lawyer
- Eduardo Castrillo (born 1942), sculptor
- Lourdes Castrillo Brillantes, author
- Roberto Castrillo (1941–2026), Cuban Olympic sport shooter

Places

- Castrillo de Cabrera
- Castrillo de Don Juan
- Castrillo de Onielo
- Castrillo de Riopisuerga
- Castrillo de Villavega
- Castrillo de la Guareña
- Castrillo de la Reina
- Castrillo de la Valduerna
- Castrillo de la Vega
- Castrillo del Val
- Castrillo Mota de Judíos

== See also ==
- Castrilli
