= Nodicia de kesos =

List of cheeses considered an early text in Leonese

In the early 20th century, Zacarías García Villada discovered the Nodicia de kesos on the backside of a tenth-century parchment recording a gift to the monastery of San Justo y Pastor, which was located in either Chozas de Abajo or Ardón del Esla in the Kingdom of León. It is a list of the cheeses used up by the monastery in various activities, either as food or as payment. Its orthography is reflective of early Iberian Romance pronunciation and diverges sharply from classical Latin. It predates any distinction between the Leonese language and Castilian, and hence is reflective of late Proto-Ibero-Romance (Galician-Portuguese had already split, since the language undergoes /ei/ > /e/). The conventional title of the list comes from its first three words (incipit) and means "list of cheeses", similar to modern Spanish noticia / lista / relación de (los) quesos.

The document is one of the texts that Ramón Menéndez Pidal used in his work Origins of Spanish (1926) to give an account of the state of peninsular romances in the 10th century.

The original is currently kept in the archives of the cathedral of León, under the name Manuscript 852v.

An "extraordinary parallel" to the Nodicia is found on a slate of Visigothic origin from the late 6th or early 7th century, discovered in Galinduste. The graffito identifies itself as a Notitia de casios.

== Text ==
1st column

Nodicia de /kesos que /espisit frater /Semeno: jn labore /de fratres jn ilo ba- /celare /de cirka Sancte Ius- /te, kesos U; jn ilo /alio de apate, /II kesos; en [que] /puseron ogano, /kesos IIII; jn ilo /de Kastrelo, I; /jn ila vinia majore, /II

List of /cheeses that spent brother /Semeno: in the work/ of the brothers in the vi /neyard /near Saint Just,/ 5 cheeses; in the /other of the abbot, /2 cheeses; in [the one that]/ they put this year, / 4 cheeses; in the one /of Castrillo, 1; /in the main vineyard, 2

2nd column

/que lebaron en fosado, /II, ad ila tore; /que baron a Cegia, /II, quando la talia- /ron ila mesa; II que /lebaron Lejione; II /..s...en /u...re... /...que... /...c... /...e...u /...alio (?) /... /g... Uane Ece; alio ke le /ba de sopbrino de Gomi /de do...a...; IIII que espi- /seron quando llo rege /uenit ad Rocola; /I qua salbatore ibi /uenit'

/that they took as war tribute, /2, to the tower; that they took to Cea, /2, when they car- /ved the table; 2 that /they took to León; 2/..s...en /u...re... /...que... /...c... /...e...u /...other (?) /... /g... Uane Ece /another that to- /ok Gomi's nephew /de do...a...; 4 that they spe- /nt when the king /came to Rozuela; /1 when Salvador /came there.
