= Monastery of Santa María de Trianos =

Monastery of Augustinian Canons in Spain

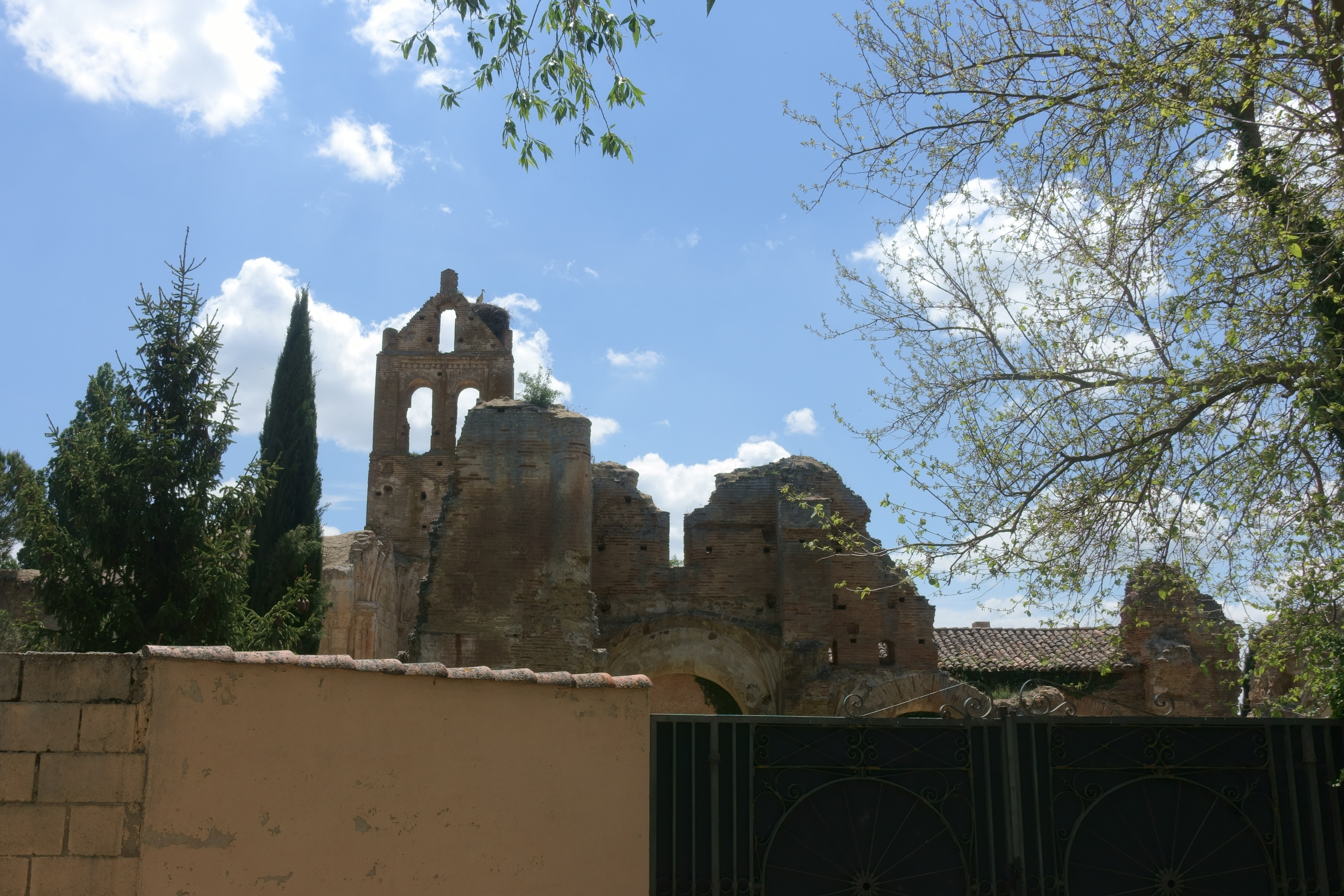
Santa María de Trianos

The Monastery of Santa María de Trianos is a former monastery of Augustinian Canons the ruins of which lie between Villapeceñil and Villamol in León province, Spain, over five kilometers north of Sahagún, in the fertile valley of the Cea River.

It was a modest monastery, but directly placed under the patronage of the Kings of León and the Holy See. Its foundation date is unknown but was before 1125 as it is mentioned in a papal bull issued by Honorius II on December 7, 1125. The local lord Alfonso Téllez de Meneses el Viejo made a donation in 1185 with his wife Gontrodo García and their children. He and his descendants continued to be benefactors of the monastery to which they granted numerous gifts. It was known for teachers of theology and philosophy but suffered confiscation and dissolution in 1835.
