= León Cathedral =

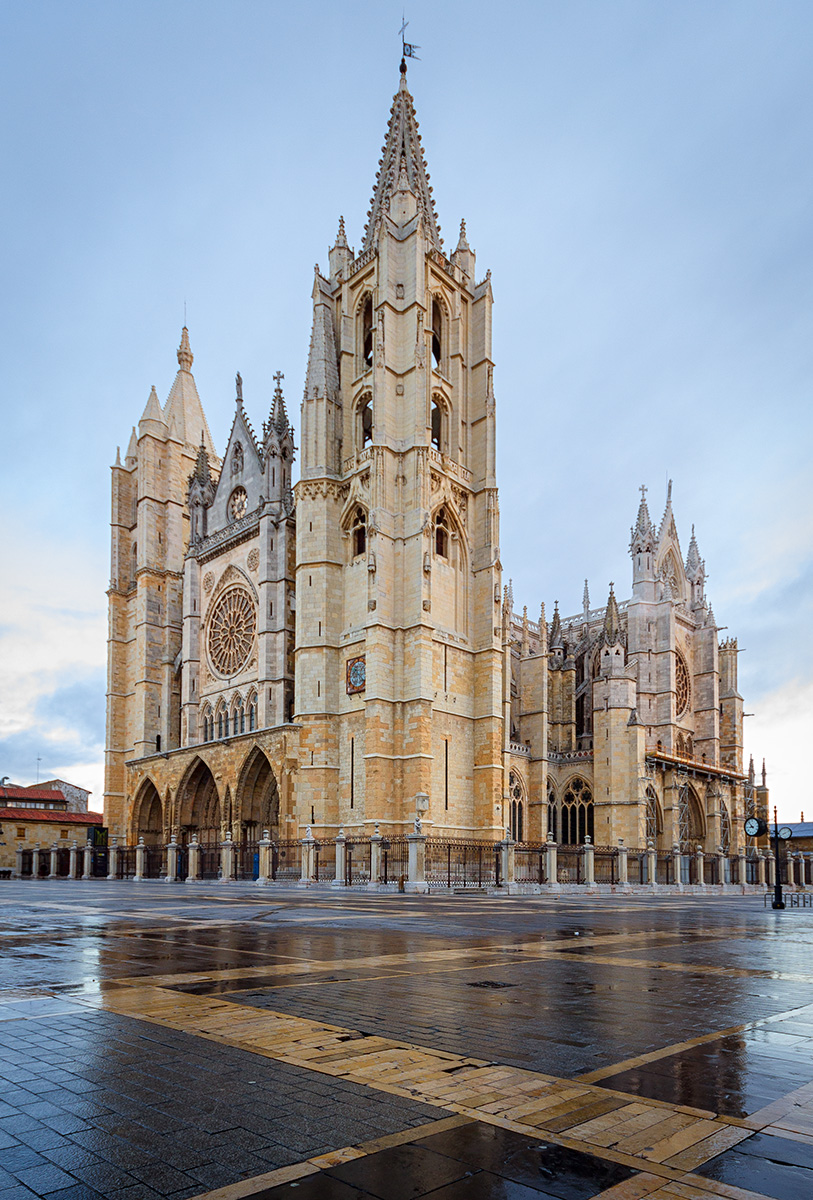
- León Cathedral
- 42°35′58″N 5°34′0″W
- Country: Spain
- Denomination: Roman Catholic
- Website: www.catedraldeleon.org/

History
- Status: Cathedral
- Dedication: Virgin Mary
- Consecrated: 13th century

Architecture
- Style: Gothic Architecture

Specifications
- Length: 90 m
- Width: 29 m
- Height: 30 m

Administration
- Province: León
- Diocese: León

Spanish Cultural Heritage
- Type: Non-movable
- Criteria: Monument
- Designated: 28 August 1844
- Reference no.: RI-51-0000001

Santa María de Regla de León Cathedral is a Catholic church, the episcopal see of the diocese of León in the city of León, Castile and León, north-western Spain, consecrated under the name of the Virgin Mary. It was the first monument declared by the Royal Order of Spain on 28 August 1844 (confirmed by the Royal Order on 24 September 1845).

Initiated in the 13th century, it is one of the greatest works of the Gothic style, with French influences. Also known as the Pulchra Leonina, which means ‘Beautiful Leonese’, it is located on the Way of Saint James, or Camino de Santiago.

The León Cathedral is mostly known for taking the “dematerialization” of gothic art to the extreme, that is, the reduction of the walls to their minimum expression to be replaced by stained glass, constituting one of the largest collections of medieval stained glass in the world.

== Current structure ==
León Cathedral, dedicated to Saint Mary, mother of Jesus, is known as the Pulchra Leonina and is a masterpiece of the Gothic style of the mid-13th century. The design is attributed to the Master Mason Enrique. By the mid 15th century it was virtually completed.

The main façade has two towers. The southern tower is known as the 'clock tower'. The Renaissance retrochoir contains alabaster sculptures by Jusquin, Copin of Holland and Juan de Malinas. Particularly noteworthy is the Plateresque iron grillwork screen or reja in the wall behind the sepulcher of King Ordoño.

It has three portals decorated with sculptures situated in the pointed arches between the two towers. The central section has a large rose window. Particularly outstanding is the image of the Virgen Blanca and the Locus Appellatione, where justice was imparted.

The church has nearly 1,800 square meters of stained glass windows. The great majority of them date from the thirteenth to the fifteenth century: a rarity among medieval gothic churches.

In the Main Chapel, there is an altarpiece by Nicolás Francés (15th century) and a silver urn containing the relics of San Froilán, the town's patron saint, made by Enrique de Arfe. The 13th- to 15th-century cloister contains sculpted details in the capitals, friezes, and ledges.

The Cathedral Museum houses a large collection of sacred art. There are almost 1,500 pieces, including 50 Romanesque sculptures of the Virgin, dating from prehistoric times to the 18th century (Neoclassicism) with works by Juan de Juni, Gregorio Fernández, Mateo Cerezo, a triptych of the School of Antwerp, a Mozarabic bible and numerous codices. The first manuscript in the Leonese language, the Nodicia de Kesos, can be found in its archives.

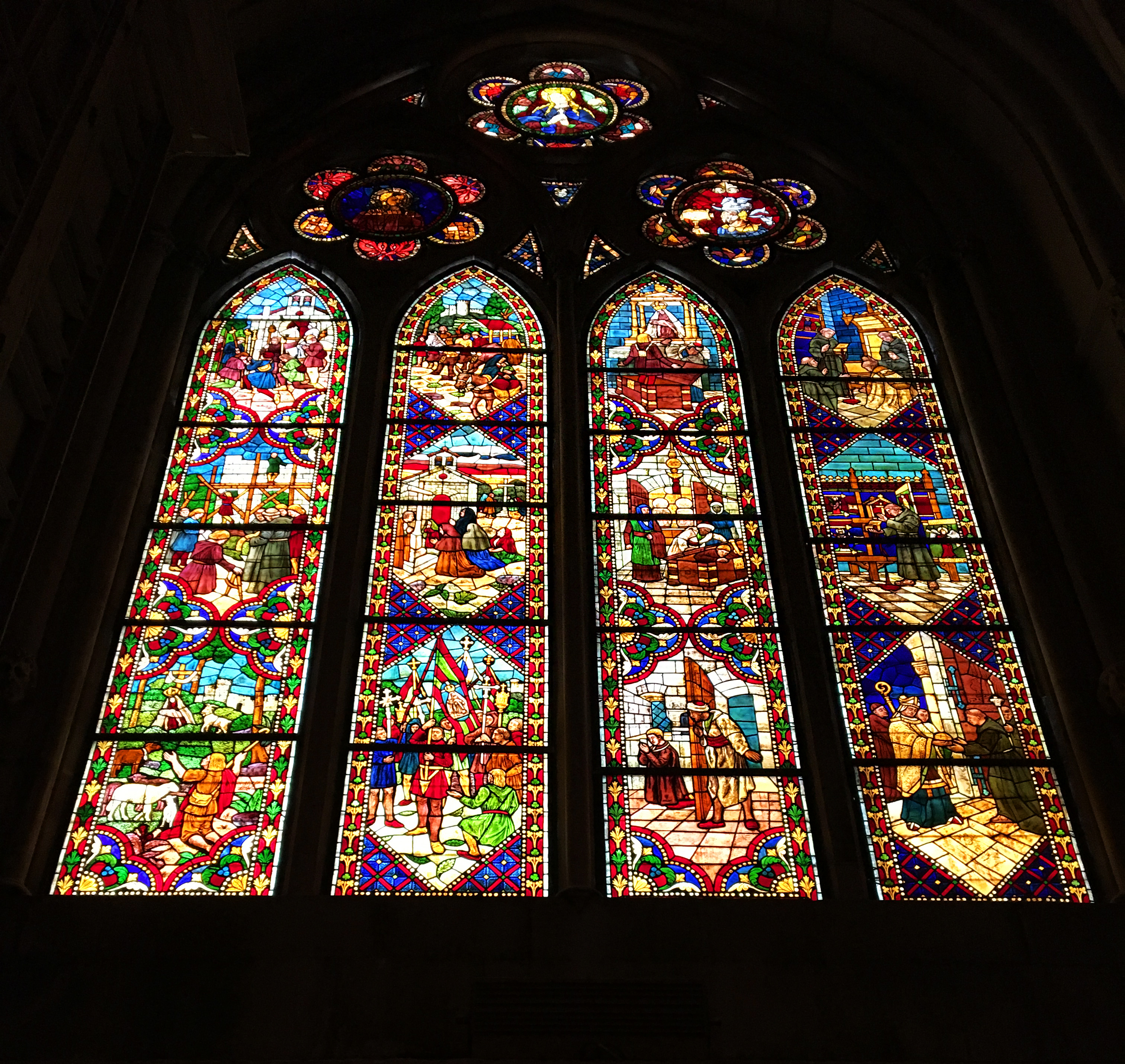
An example of the many stained-glass windows

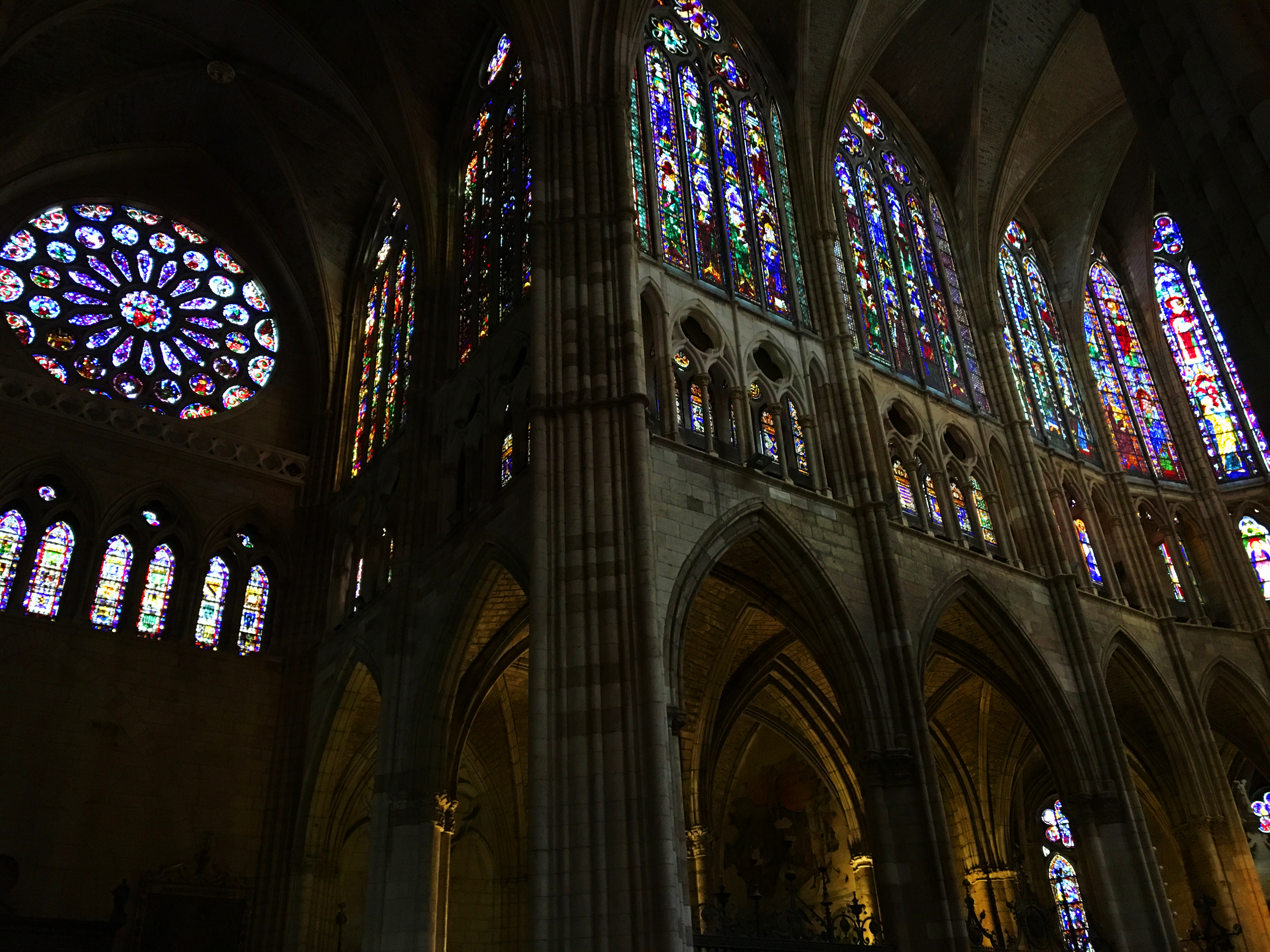
Wide view of the north part of the cathedral

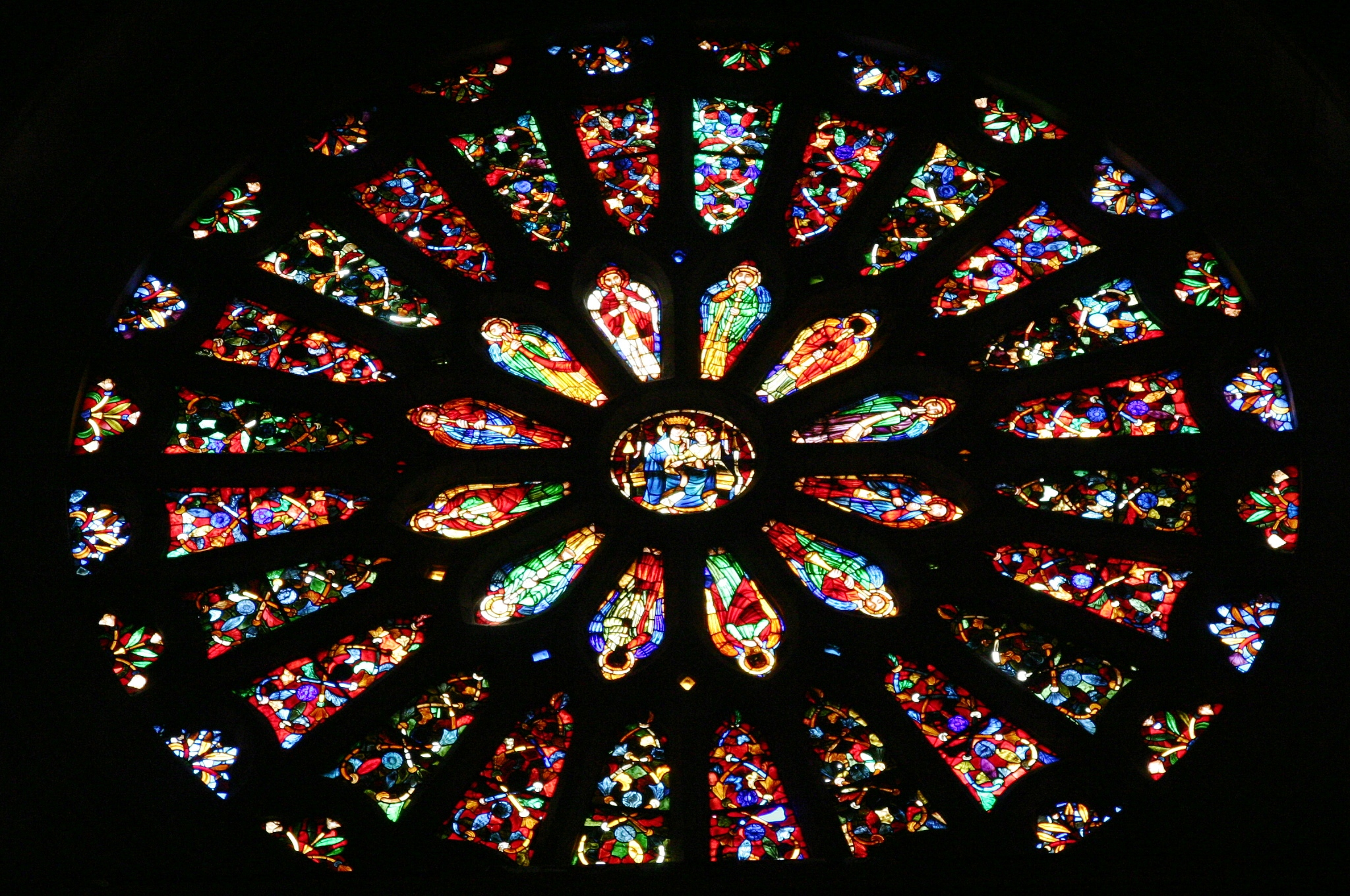
Main rosette

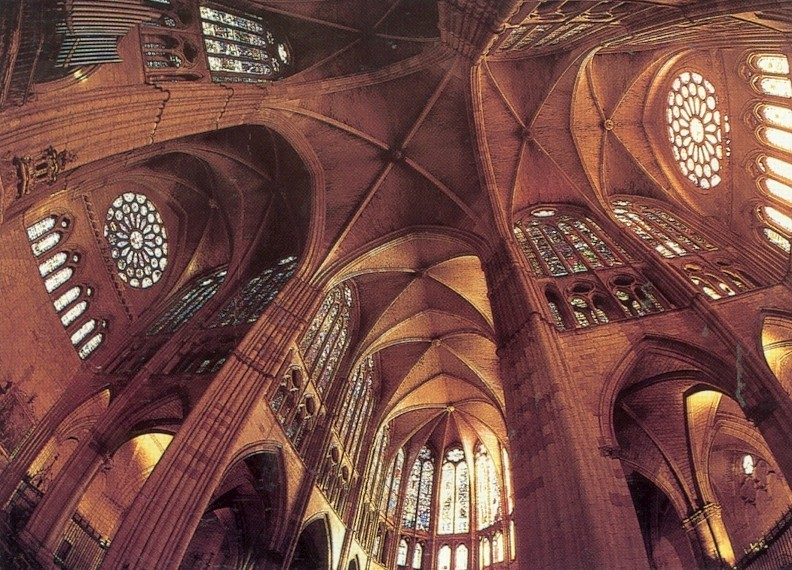
Vaulting of the crossing

Leon Cathedral is also one of the three most important cathedrals, along with that of Burgos and Santiago de Compostela, on The Way of Saint James (or in Spanish, El Camino de Santiago). It was declared a Monument of Cultural Interest in 1844.

== History ==
=== Previous constructions ===
Palace of Ordoño II and roman baths

Originally, on the current site of the cathedral, the Legio VII Gemina had built thermal baths larger in size than the current cathedral. During the great restoration of the building in the 19th century, the remains of the thermal baths were discovered under the cathedral, and in 1996, others were discovered near the south façade. Little remains of these primitive buildings, only some vestiges of mosaics, roof tiles (tegulas), and ceramics, displayed today at the cathedral museum. Others, like the hypocaust, remain under the site.

Primitive cathedral

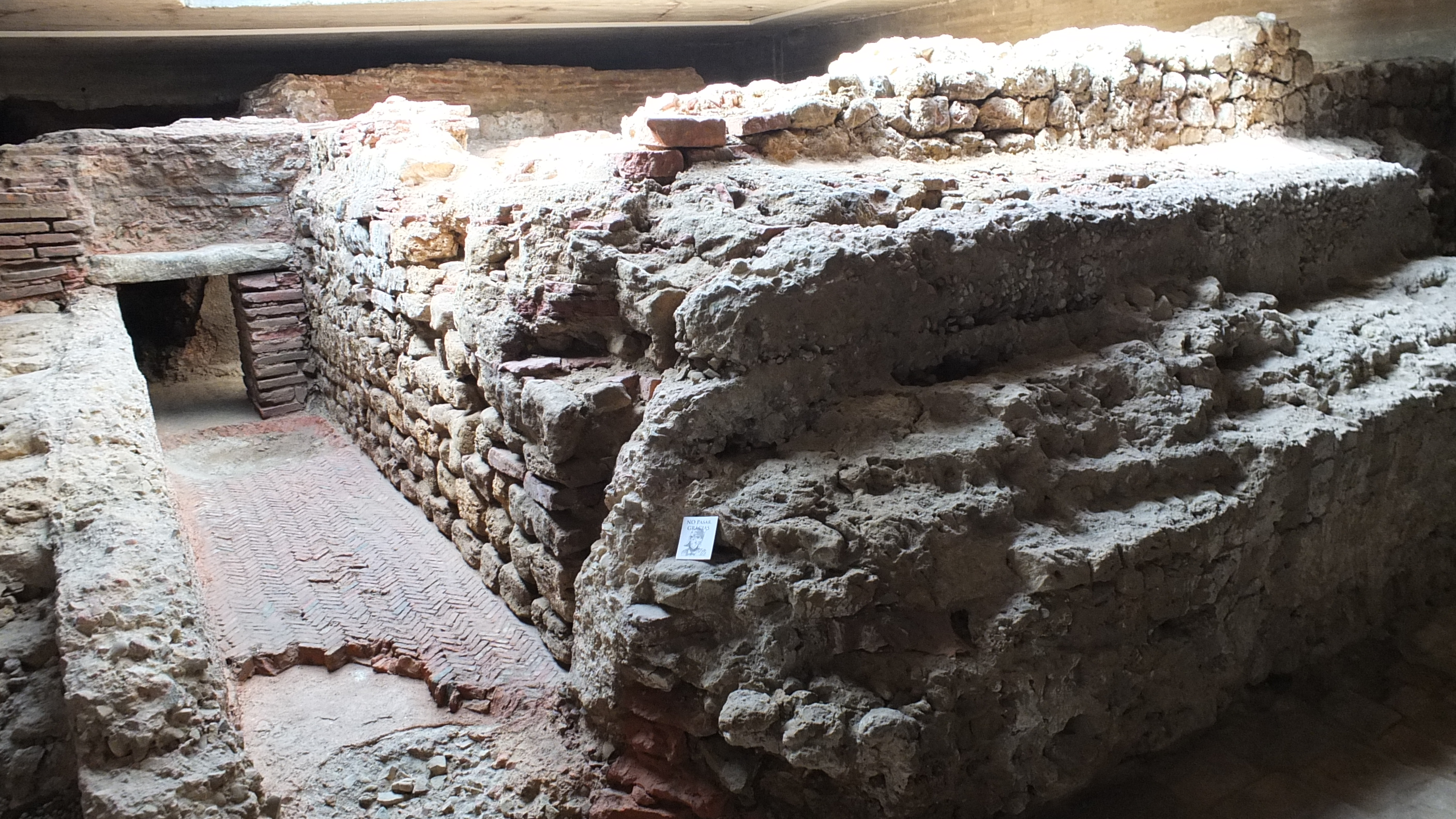
Remains of the thermal baths of Legio VII in the crypt of Puerta Obispo

During the Reconquista (Christian reconquest) the ancient Roman baths were converted into a royal palace. King Ordoño II, who had occupied the throne of Leon in 916, defeated the Arabs in the Battle of San Esteban de Gormaz in 917. As a sign of gratitude to God for victory, he gave up his palace to build the first cathedral. Under the episcopate of Fruminio II, the building was transformed into a sacred place. The tomb of Ordoño II of Leon, who died in 924, is found in the cathedral.

The temple was guarded and governed by monks of the Order of St. Benedict, and it is likely that its structure was very similar to many others existing during the Leonese Mozarabic period. Almanzor campaigned through these lands in the late 10th century, devastating the city and destroying the temples. However, damage to the building of the cathedral appears to have been rapidly addressed, since in the year 999 King Alfonso V was crowned in the church.

After the political turmoil and Moorish raids that lasted until 1067 the state of the cathedral was in extreme poverty. This would move to King Ferdinand I of León, who, after transferring the remains of San Isidoro to León, sought to restore the temple. This king achieved success in the expansion of the kingdom.

Romanesque cathedral

With the help of the infanta Urraca of Zamora, the first-born daughter of the king, begins the construction of a second cathedral, according to the aspirations of the city and the Romanesque style. It was within the episcopal see of Pelagius of Oviedo, or Pelayo II. Between 1884 and 1888, when the architect Demetrio de los Ríos, excavated the basement of the cathedral to replace the pavement and lay the foundations of the pillars, he found part of the walls and factory of the second cathedral. Through the plan that he drew, we notice how everything was configured within the Gothic: It was built in brick and masonry, with three naves finished in semicircular apses, dedicating the central nave to Saint Mary, as in the previous church. A cloister was also built on the north side. The new church was significant in dimensions, measuring 60 meters in length and 40 meters in maximum width. Although all of it was executed within the international currents of the Romanesque, contemplating what has survived of its statutory, we can find out that it had an indigenous character, still using the horseshoe arch, at least as a decorative form. It was consecrated on 10 November 1073, during the reign of Alfonso VI. Presumably the same stonemasons who built the Basilica of San Isidoro of León also worked on the León Cathedral.

The cathedral remained in place until the end of the next century. When the last proprietary king of León, Alfonso IX, accedes to the throne, the city and in the kingdom witness an important change in society, artistic creativity, and cultural development.

=== Construction of the current Gothic cathedral ===
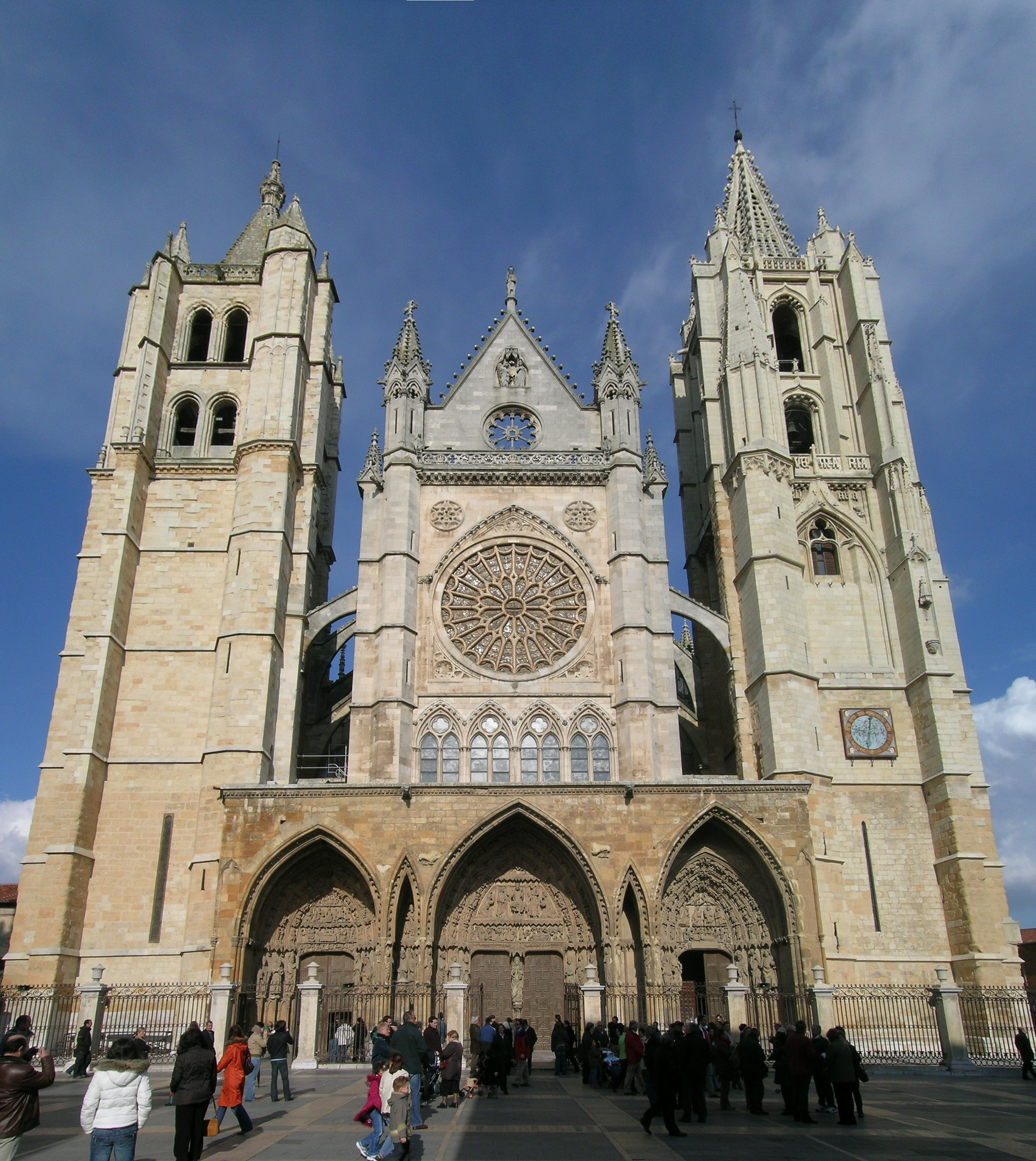
León Cathedral, west front

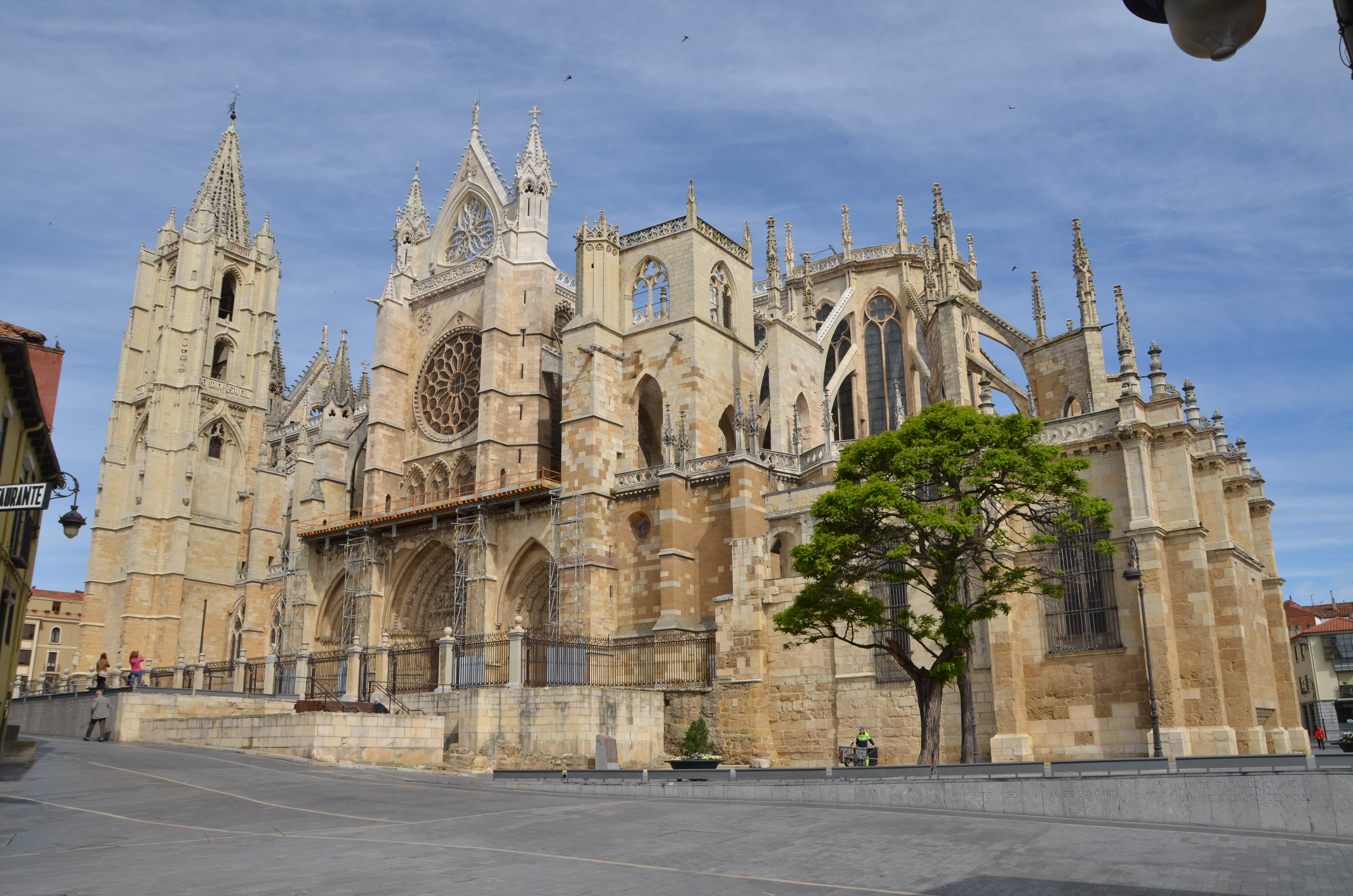
South side

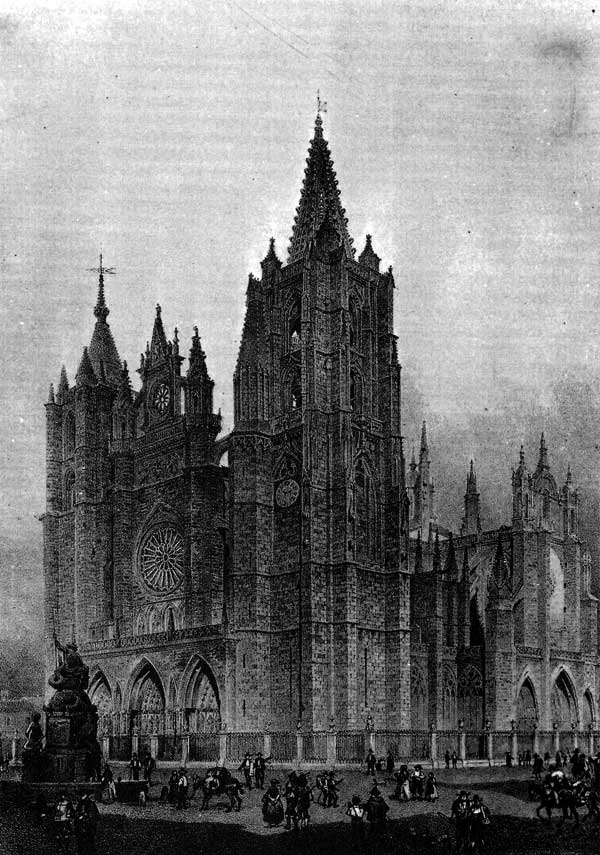
The cathedral around 1850, with plateresque gables in the façades and the baroque dome and pinnacles in the crossing

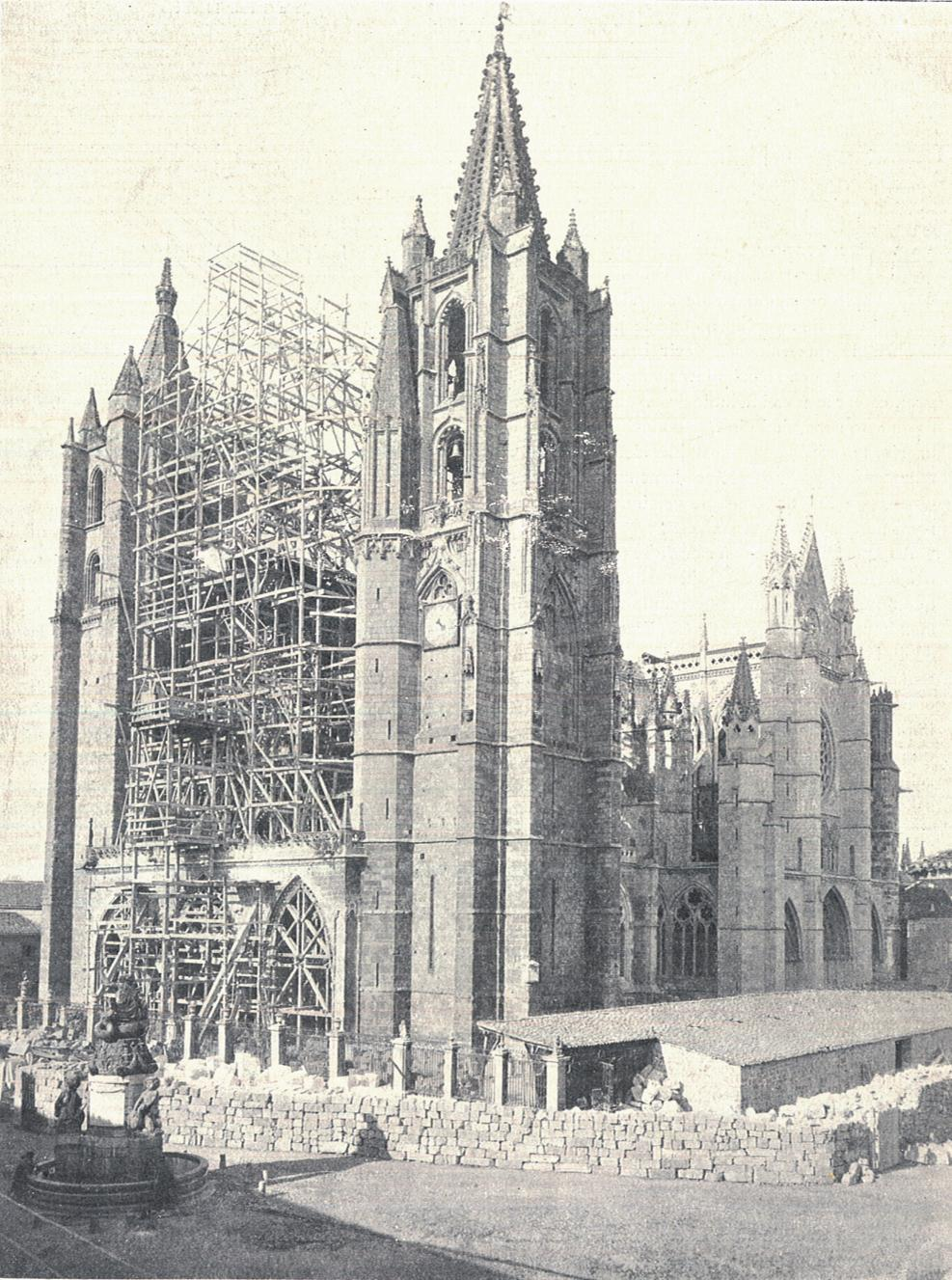
Restoration of the Western façade, approximately 1890

Construction of the third cathedral began around the year 1205, but problems in structural foundation paralyzed construction, and the work was not resumed until 1255. Under the pontificate of Bishop Martín Fernández and the support of King Alfonso X de Castilla, this new cathedral became entirely Gothic.

The architect of the cathedral seems to have been Master Enrique, probably a native of France, who had previously worked on Burgos Cathedral. It is evident that he was familiar with Gothic architectural form of Île-de-France. He died in 1277 and was replaced with the Spanish Juan Pérez. In 1289, Bishop Martín Fernández also died, when the top of the church was open for worship. The fundamental structure of the cathedral was soon completed, in 1302, with Bishop Gonzalo Osorio opening the entire church to the faithful, although the cloister and the north tower were still not completed; the south tower was not completed until the second half of the 15th century. This promptness in completion gives the cathedral a great unity of architectural style.

The León Cathedral was inspired by the layout of the Reims Cathedral (although it was smaller in area size), which was well known to Master Enrique. Like most French cathedrals, León was constructed with modular geometry based on the triangle (ad triangulum), whose members related to the square root of 3, to which the totality of its parts and the whole respond. This aspect, like the plan, the elevations, and the decorative and symbolic repertoires, convert the cathedral into an authentic trans-Pyrenees building, away from the Hispanic current, which has earned it the qualifications of "the most French of Spanish cathedrals," or the Pulchra Leonina.

In addition to its layout, the Cathedral of Leon is also inspired by that of Rheims in its structure, the form of the chapels of its ambulatory (in this case polygonal), and the development of its transept. The influence of Chartres Cathedral can be seen in the western porch. The one in Leon abandons the model of Rheims Cathedral in the elevations beyond the body of the clerestory, as it is transparent there and it accommodates the technical progress achieved in the Sainte Chapelle in Paris and Amiens Cathedral.

French influence is also found in developing the chancel, where initially the choir was to be put according to their custom. Specifically Leonese is the location of the cloister, with no organic tie to the temple, the exit in the floor plan of the towers of the main façade, displaying the elevation of the buttresses of the nave, and the discontinuity of the five naves at the front end of the main area of the temple, which were reduced to three.

The problem was that a major part of the site sits upon Roman remains, hypocaust of the second century, which complicated the foundation of the pillars. The accumulation of moisture and water leakage caused serious problems for the master builders. Besides that, most of the stones were of mediocre quality, a type of limestone, with little resistance to atmospheric agents. Furthermore, the subtlety of its style was a challenge to its material; its numerous supports were extremely fragile, the lines are reduced to total optimization, in such a way that various architects of the time questioned the cathedral's ability to remain standing. This almost implausible structure, together with the poor quality of stone and foundation, caused it to suffer constant interventions and restorations since the 10th century, making the church a European paradigm of transformation intervention, restoration, and conservation.

==== Modifications and restorations ====
Extensive modifications and additions have been made to the cathedral, sometimes trying to improve its stability but also to adapt it to contemporary taste, until restorations beginning in the nineteenth century tried to remove most non-Gothic elements and restore the building to its original, purely Gothic state.

In the fifteenth century, the south tower was finished, in the Flamboyant Gothic style. Also in this style was the library, currently the Chapel of Santiago, built by Juan de Badajoz el Viejo at the end of the century.

In the sixteenth century, Juan de Badajoz started the addition of non-Gothic elements with the construction of a plateresque gable in the Western façade, too tall and heavy. He also added a plateresque sacristy in the south-east end of the cathedral and rebuilt some vaults.

Serious problems started in the seventeenth century. Parts of the largest vault in the crossing fell down in 1631. It was replaced by a baroque semicircular dome designed by Juan de Naveda. This addition damaged the delicate balance of the whole building, causing cracks in the southern façade that needed restoration in the end of the century, including a new gable.

In the eighteenth century, Joaquin de Churriguera tried to improve stability by adding four pinnacles around the dome, but this caused further damage. The cathedral was affected by the Lisbon earthquake of 1755. Extensive rebuilding of the southern façade was done.

In 1857, stones started to fall down from the central nave and the crossing, causing fears of a complete collapse. Matías Laviña started a full restoration of the building in 1859. He dismantled the central dome and the pinnacles, parts of the transept and the southern façade.

After Laviña died in 1868, Juan de Madrazo was commissioned to direct the restoration. He was a friend of Viollet-le-Duc and had a good knowledge of the French Gothic style. The goal of his extensive work was making the Cathedral stable and restoring its original pure Gothic style. He placed a complex wooden support structure to keep the vaults in place and proceeded to rebuild the vaults and the southern façade. When the supports were removed in 1878 and the building resisted, it meant that the original Gothic balance system had been restored.

Madrazo's successors, Demetrio de los Ríos and Juan Bautista Lázaro, kept removing alien elements, like the plateresque gable in the Western façade, and replacing them with Neo-Gothic designs. The stained glass windows, that had been dismantled and stored for years, were restored after 1895. Finally, the cathedral was reopened in 1901, after one of the most complex and extensive restoration projects in nineteenth-century Europe.

Smaller restoration works were undertaken during the twentieth century. A fire caused by lightning consumed the rooftop on 27 May 1966, but the structure suffered no serious damage (thanks, partly, to the decision of not using too much water to put out the blaze). A general project to restore the stained glass started in 2009.

== General characteristics ==
=== Generalities of Gothic architecture ===
In Gothic architecture, the use of pointed arches (or ogival arches) and the rib vault is generalized, thus concentrating the pressure on certain points and not on the entire wall, which allows for the making of slender cathedrals (on the one hand, the arch can be lengthened without expanding its width as it was in the Romanesque period which reduces pressure by making lighter roofs, allowing the walls to be opened.) The Romanesque tribune disappears and the lateral thrusts that it resolves are sent to the flying buttresses, arches that transmit the thrust of the roof to the exterior buttresses, which were previously topped with pinnacles. The large stained-glass windows are a representation of Gothic interest in connecting with the people. For example, the sensation of verticality corresponds to the idea of the heavenly Jerusalem, in comparison to the sensation of hospitality and security for the faithful in the Romanesque. This type of construction used to have an odd number of naves (three or five) supported by quadripartite, sexpartite, tercelet, fan, or star rib vault.

The main façade is generally structures in three flared openings, consisting of archivolts, jambs, and framed in a gable, a gallery of Old Testament kings, a large rose window (in the central nave), an andito (space through which the façade is accessed to perform possible reforms), and by two towers of different characteristics (roofed or not with an arrow-shaped pinnacle).

=== Architectural plan ===
The plan is almost a replica of the Reims Cathedral, although in a somewhat smaller format. It is 90 meters long, 30 meters high, and 29 meters wide. Divided in three naves, from the entrance to the transept, and in five names from the transept to the main altar. The cathedral shows macrocephaly, that is a roof larger than usual (the width of the transept in this case), which takes away some depth and perspective but instead provides more space for worshippers; being on the Way of Saint James, its influx is greater than other churches. The naves of the León Cathedral are covered with quadripartite rib vaults in rectangular sections. The transept is built with a quadripartite vault, which replaced the Baroque dome of the 17th century in the work undertaken at the end of the 19th century to be consistent with the rest of the construction. It has 125 windows, with 1800 meters² of polychrome stained glass of medieval origin, being considered one of the best in the world of its kind. Of them stands out the large central rose window located in the central portico, between the two spire towers, as well as those of the Main Chapel, the north transept, and the Chapel of Santiago.

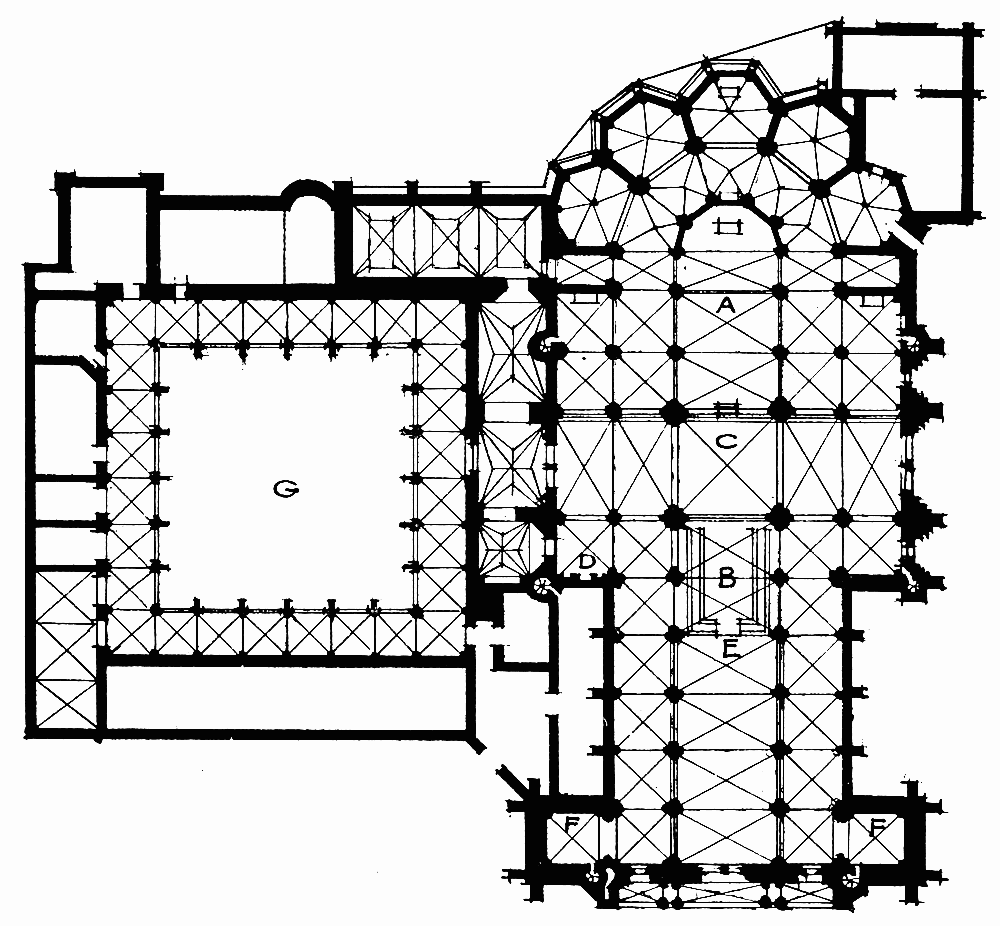
Plan

A. Capilla Mayor

B. Choir

C. Crossing

D. Tombs

E. Nave

F. Towers

G. Cloisters

== Bibliography ==
In Spanish

- Ricardo Puente, La Catedral de Santa María de León. León, Imprenta Moderna. Editor Ricardo Puente.
- Luis A. Grau Lobo, La Catedral de León. León, Editorial Everest.
- José Javier Rivera Blanco, Las Catedrales de Castilla y León (parte correspondiente a la catedral de León). León, Editorial Edilesa.
- Juan Eloy Díaz-Jiménez, Catedral de León. El retablo. Madrid, Tipografía de la Revista de Archivos, Bibliotecas y Museos, 1907.
- Inventa Multimedia, La Catedral de León. Exposición: El sueño de la razón.. Avilés, Inventa multimedia, S.L., 2001. web del proyecto
- Laviña, Matías (1876). La Catedral de León. Memoria (Facsímile). España: Editorial Maxtor. ISBN 84-95636-48-4.

In English

- Álvarez Martínez, Rosario (2002). "Music Iconography of Romanesque Sculpture in the Light of Sculptors' Work Procedures: The Jaca Cathedral, Las Platerías in Santiago de Compostela, and San Isidoro de León". Music in Art: International Journal for Music Iconography. 27 (1–2): 13–45. ISSN 1522-7464.
