= Valdenebro de los Valles =

Coordinates: 41°51′N 4°58′W

- Municipality
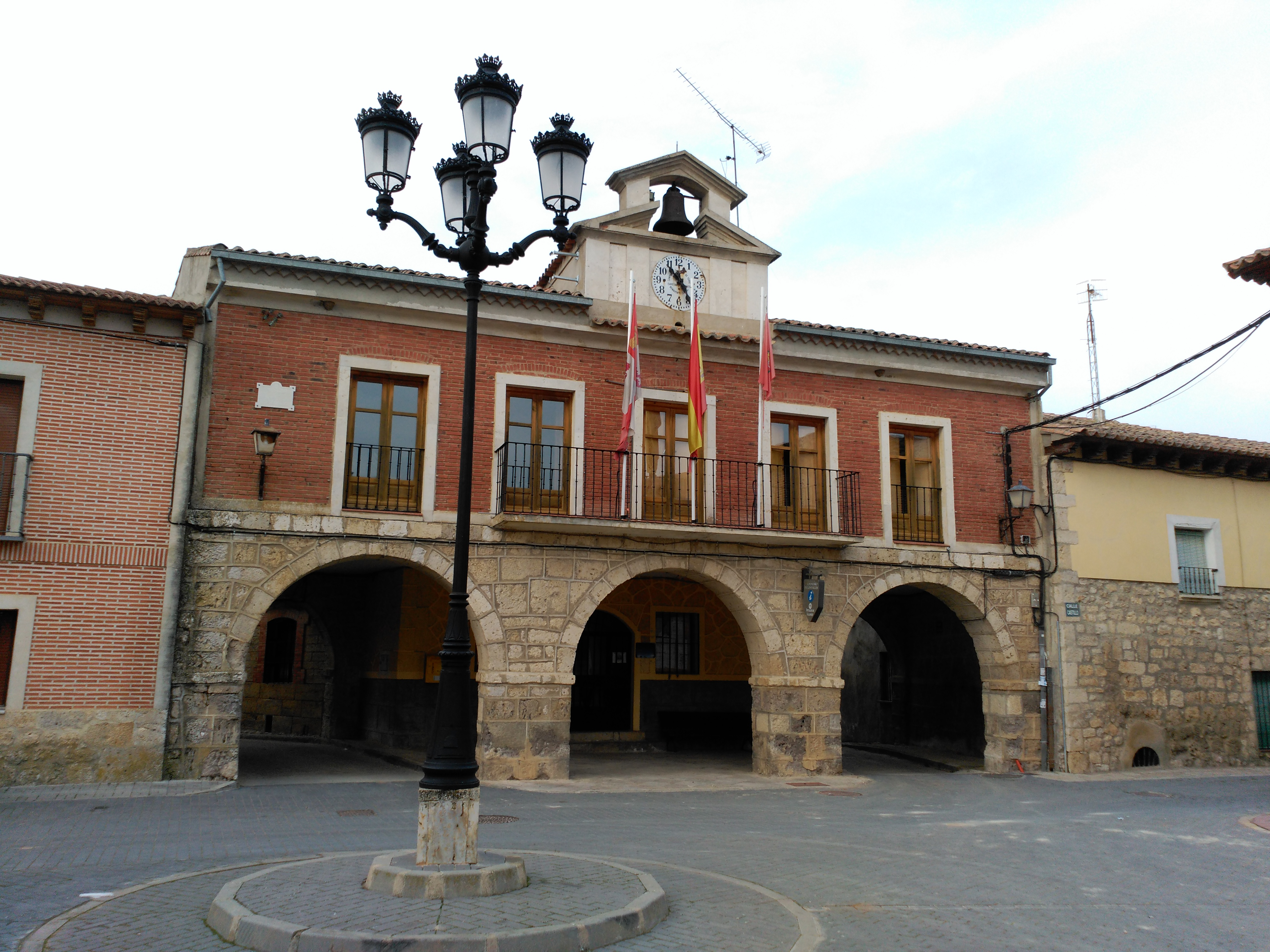
- Town Hall of Valdenebro de los Valles (Valladolid).
- Interactive map of Valdenebro de los Valles
- Country: Spain
- Autonomous community: Castile and León
- Province: Valladolid

Government
  - Alcalde (Mayor): José Mario Gutiérrez Vaquero

Area
  - Total: 42.13 km^{2} (16.27 sq mi)
- Elevation: 862.4 m (2,829 ft)

Population (2025-01-01)
  - Total: 187
  - Density: 4.44/km^{2} (11.5/sq mi)
- Time zone: UTC+1 (CET)
  - Summer (DST): UTC+2 (CEST)

Valdenebro de los Valles is a municipality located in the province of Valladolid, in Castile and León, Spain. According to the 2017 census (INE), the municipality has a population of 208 inhabitants.
