= Ardón =

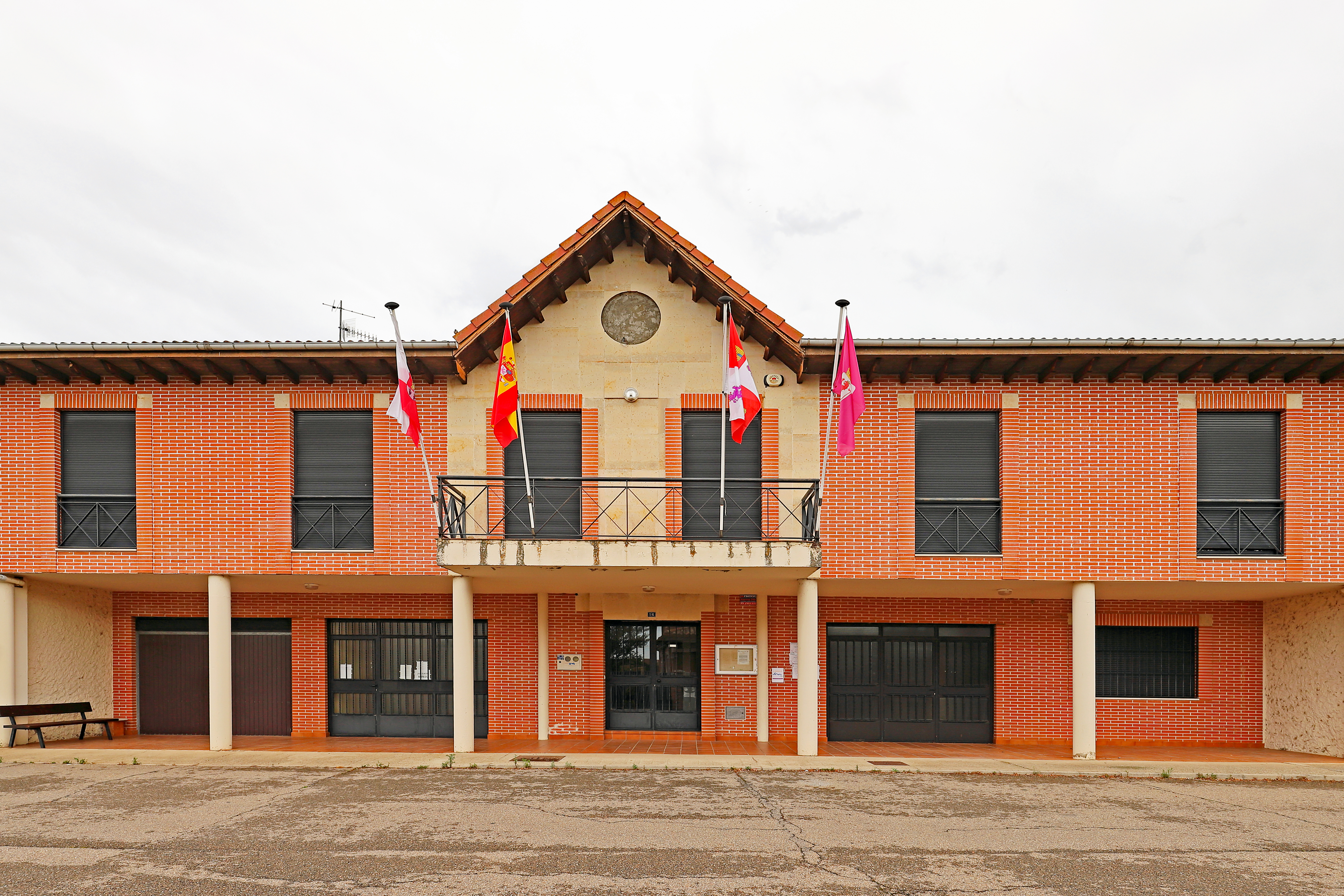
- Town hall

- Flag Coat of arms

- Location within Spain
- Coordinates: 42°26′14″N 5°33′45″W
- Country: Spain
- Autonomous community: Castile and León
- Province: León
- Municipality: Ardón

Government
  - Mayor: Jesús Alonso Castillo (PP)

Area
  - Total: 48.65 km^{2} (18.78 sq mi)
- Elevation: 766 m (2,513 ft)

Population (2025-01-01)
  - Total: 533
  - Density: 11.0/km^{2} (28.4/sq mi)
- Time zone: UTC+1 (CET)
  - Summer (DST): UTC+2 (CEST)
- Postal Code: 24232
- Telephone prefix: 987

Ardón (Spanish pronunciation: [aɾˈðon]) is a municipality located in the province of León, Castile and León, Spain. According to the 2004 census (INE), the municipality has a population of 659 inhabitants.

== See also ==
- Leonese language
- Kingdom of León
- Nodicia de kesos
