= Nicolás Francés =

Spanish painter

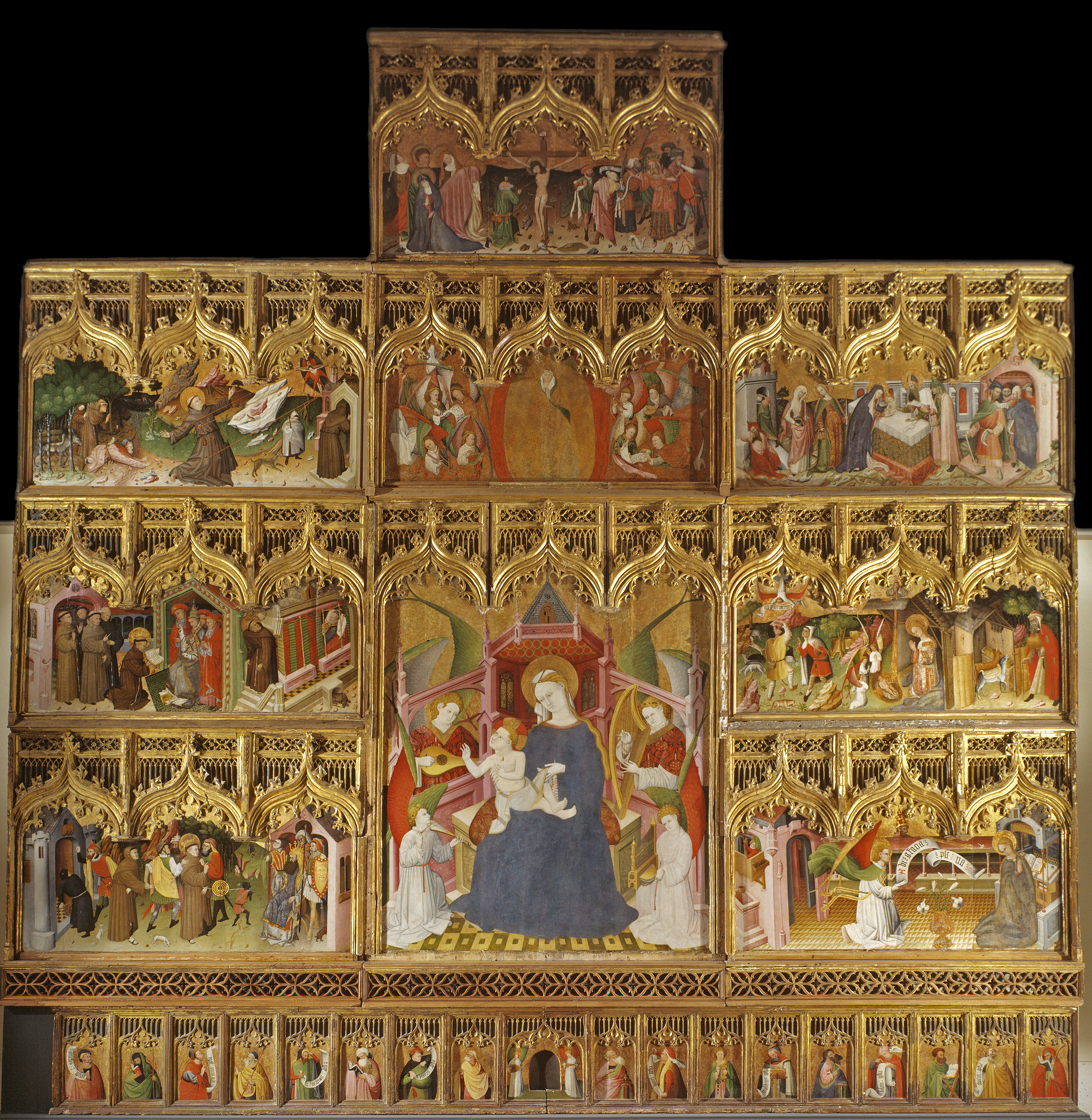
Life of the Virgin and Saint Francis by Nicolás Francés, altarpiece, now located in Museo del Prado

Nicolás Francés (died 1468) was a Spanish painter and miniaturist.

== Early life ==
Originally from Burgundy, Francés has been documented as residing in León, Spain since before 1434 and until May 1468, the date of his death. He worked on an altarpiece for the León Cathedral, around July 25, 1434. A year later he had fixed his residence along with his wife Juana Martinez to Cardiles Street, in a house owned by the city council. By 1461 the painter had executed major expansions to the house. He added a kitchen with cellar, yard, well, stable and barn, and farms.

== León Cathedral ==
The old altar of the León Cathedral, made up of more than a hundred tables, was since dismantled in 1740 after being replaced by another Baroque altarpiece. Only five of the eighteen major scenes were embedded in the current neomudéjar altarpiece, and a score of smaller tables occupying the grooves, reused in the episcopal chair of the same presbytery. The motifs represented, with a major feature anecdotal painter and symbolic content, are scenes from the lives of San Froilan, Bishop of Leon, and the Virgin Mary. Also characteristic are the bright colors that highlight the table, which according to Sánchez Canton, Francés is the first painter to handle the oil painting technique in Castile, after similar work by Jan van Eyck, although in fact it is a tempera painting with glazes.

== Additional work ==
Francés continuously worked to serve the city council as shown by a document from 1445, where it was said that he had become very necessary for the work at the Cathedral. In 1452 the cathedral chapter entrusted to toe painting a mural temple Doomsday, destroyed in the early nineteenth century. In preparation he traveled to Salamanca to study Judgement fresco painted a few years ago by Nicholas Florentino in the Old Cathedral. In 1459 he started the decoration of the cloister, hired ten years ago, for which he made a series of thirty-one evangelical matters murals, of which twenty have arrived in poor condition. Providing additional information on the progress of the project, fabric and revenue books of the cathedral documented many related orders of various kinds, from providing the lead for the windows of the chapel of San Fabian and San Sebastián (now Santa Teresa), where the paintings are also murals dating from 1459, the gold of the organs, cleaning a statue of the Virgin or painting a banner. In the same cathedral there are some additional paintings with some other murals in the apse chapels and traces of the windows of the door of the Virgen del Dado, also attributed to Francés.

== Style ==
The cathedral altarpiece paintings documented, along with a picture of the Nativity, allegedly signed with an "N" in a hymnal of the collegiate Basilica of San Isidoro, helped define his style of painting, which combines the clarity and Italian Flemish attention to detail, and attribute some other works, among which the Altarpiece of the Life of the Virgin and Saint Francis (Museo del Prado), from Chapel Farm Esteva of Delights in the vicinity of La Bañeza. Acquired by the state between 1930 and 1932, the altarpiece, painted perhaps for an unknown Franciscan monastery consists of nine large tables on three streets and three bodies, with the Virgin and Child enthroned between angels in the central panel, scenes the life of St. Francis of Assisi on the left and right, and sixteen small panels with apostles and prophets.

His work is considered one of St. Jerome altarpiece owned by the National Gallery of Ireland and a possible table altarpiece dedicated to St. Michael that resides in Nationalmuseum was also attributed to Francés. An "early work", the altarpiece Counter Hood Saldana Lopez at the Royal Convent of Santa Clara is also attributed to him, probably using imported labor.
