= Población de Arroyo =

Coordinates: 42°20′N 4°52′W

- municipality
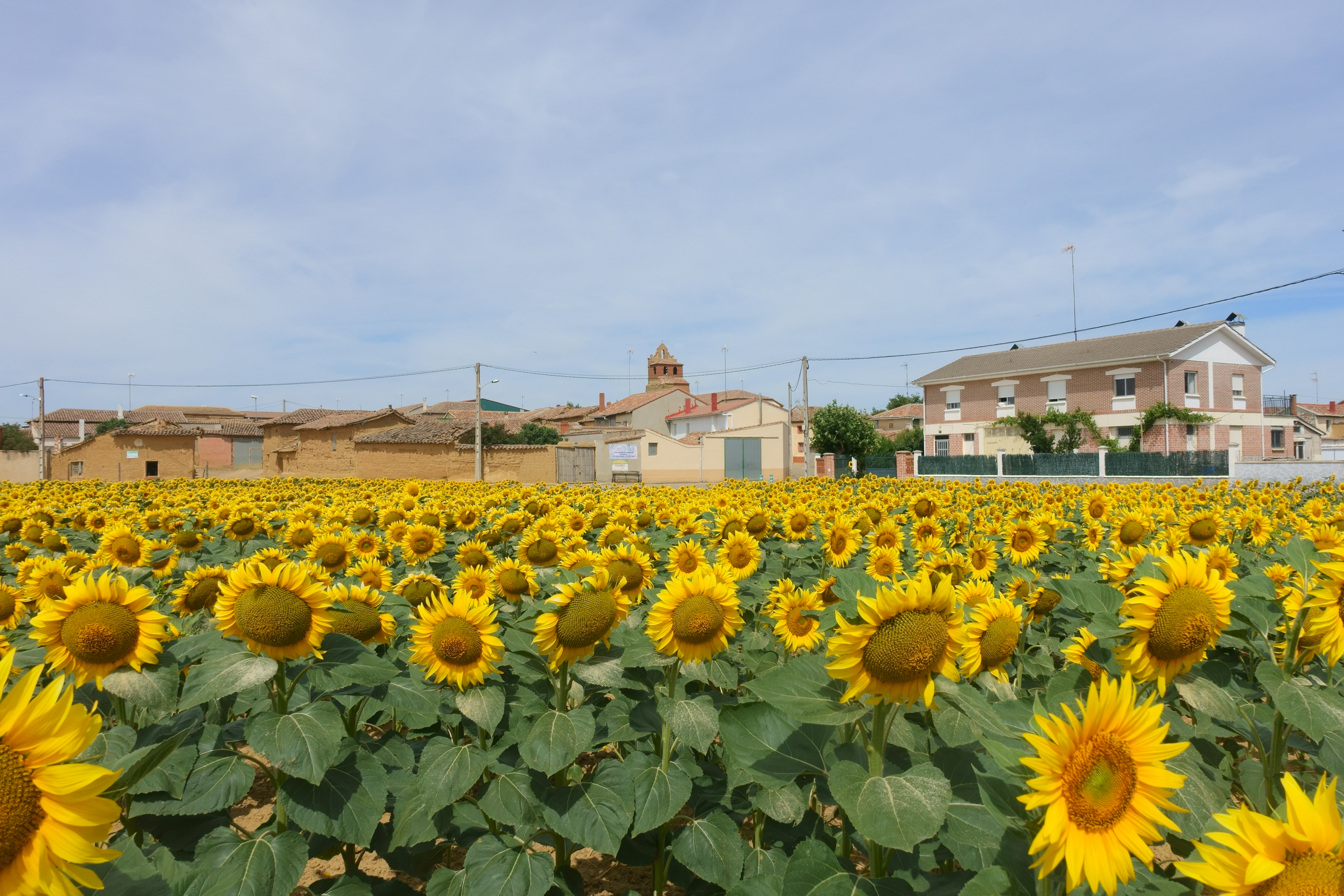
- Interactive map of Población de Arroyo
- Country: Spain
- Autonomous community: Castile and León
- Province: Palencia
- Municipality: Población de Arroyo

Area
  - Total: 22 km^{2} (8.5 sq mi)

Population (2025-01-01)
  - Total: 44
  - Density: 2.0/km^{2} (5.2/sq mi)
- Time zone: UTC+1 (CET)
  - Summer (DST): UTC+2 (CEST)
- Website: Official website

Población de Arroyo is a municipality located in the province of Palencia, Castile and León, Spain. According to the 2004 census (INE), the municipality has a population of 88 inhabitants.
