= Corcos =

Coordinates: 41°48′00″N 4°41′00″W

Corcos, Spain
- Flag Coat of arms

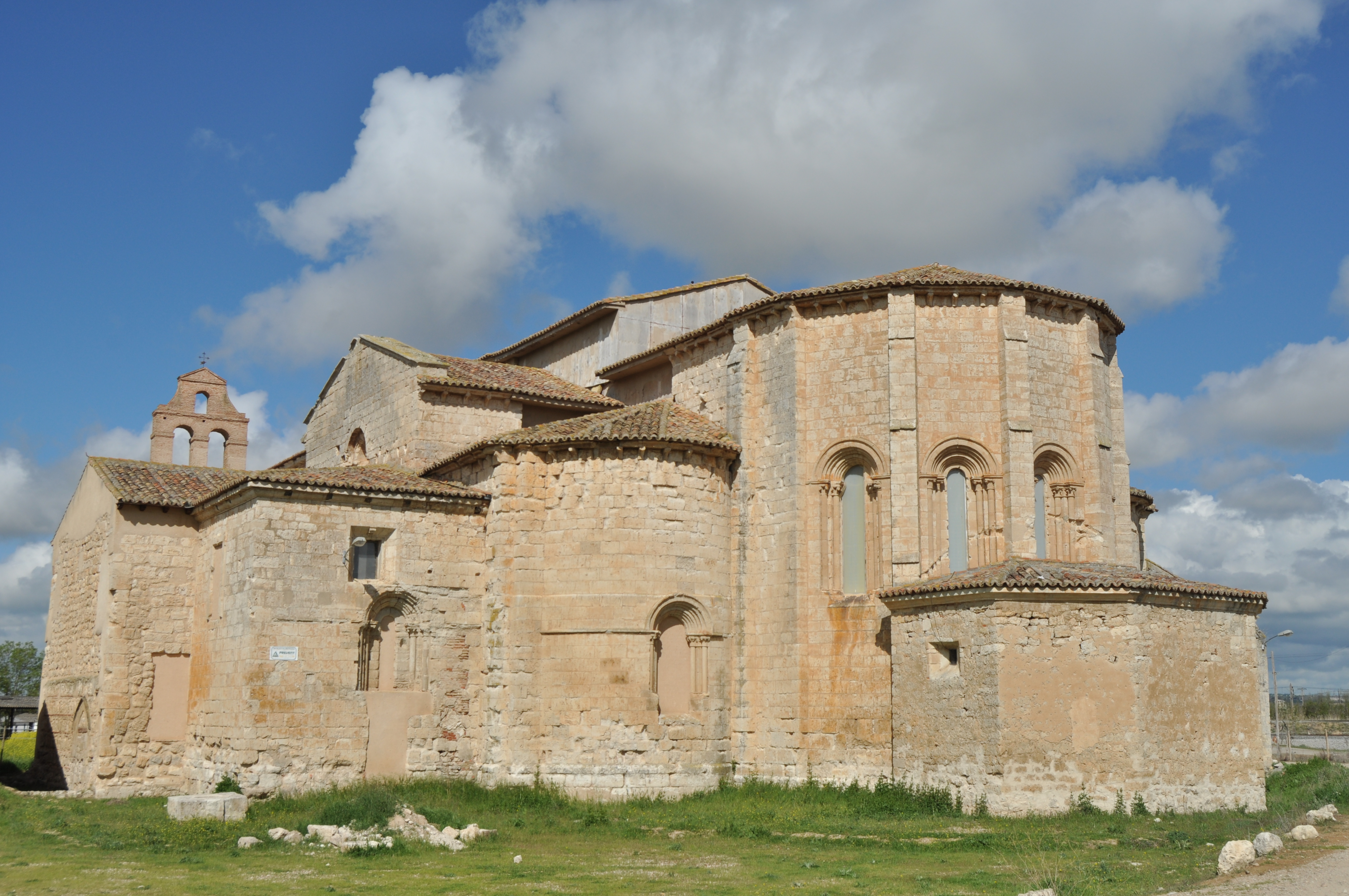
- Monastery of Santa María de Palazuelos
- Country: Spain
- Autonomous community: Castile and León
- Province: Valladolid
- Municipality: Corcos

Area
  - Total: 42 km^{2} (16 sq mi)

Population (2025-01-01)
  - Total: 203
  - Density: 4.8/km^{2} (13/sq mi)
- Time zone: UTC+1 (CET)
  - Summer (DST): UTC+2 (CEST)

Corcos is a municipality located in the province of Valladolid, Castile and León, Spain. According to the 2004 census (INE), the municipality has a population of 258 inhabitants.

== See also ==
- Cuisine of the province of Valladolid
