= Frechilla =

Coordinates: 42.150°N 4.833°W

- municipality
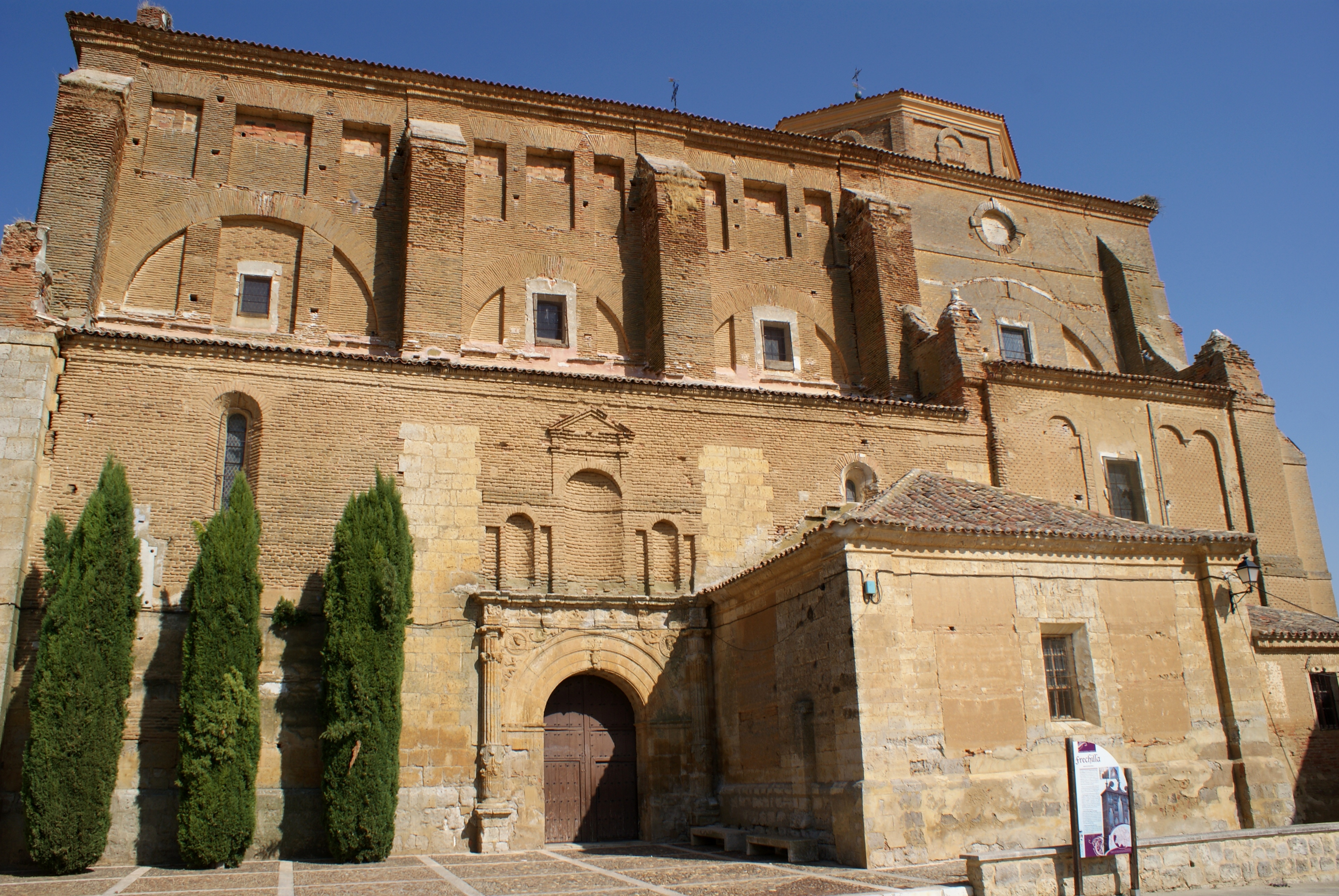

- Coat of arms
- Interactive map of Frechilla
- Country: Spain
- Autonomous community: Castile and León
- Province: Palencia
- Municipality: Frechilla

Area
  - Total: 34 km^{2} (13 sq mi)

Population (2025-01-01)
  - Total: 138
  - Density: 4.1/km^{2} (11/sq mi)
- Time zone: UTC+1 (CET)
  - Summer (DST): UTC+2 (CEST)
- Website: Official website

Frechilla is a municipality located in the province of Palencia, Castile and León, Spain. According to the 2004 census (INE), the municipality has a population of 249 inhabitants.
