= Cea, León =

Cea
- Municipality
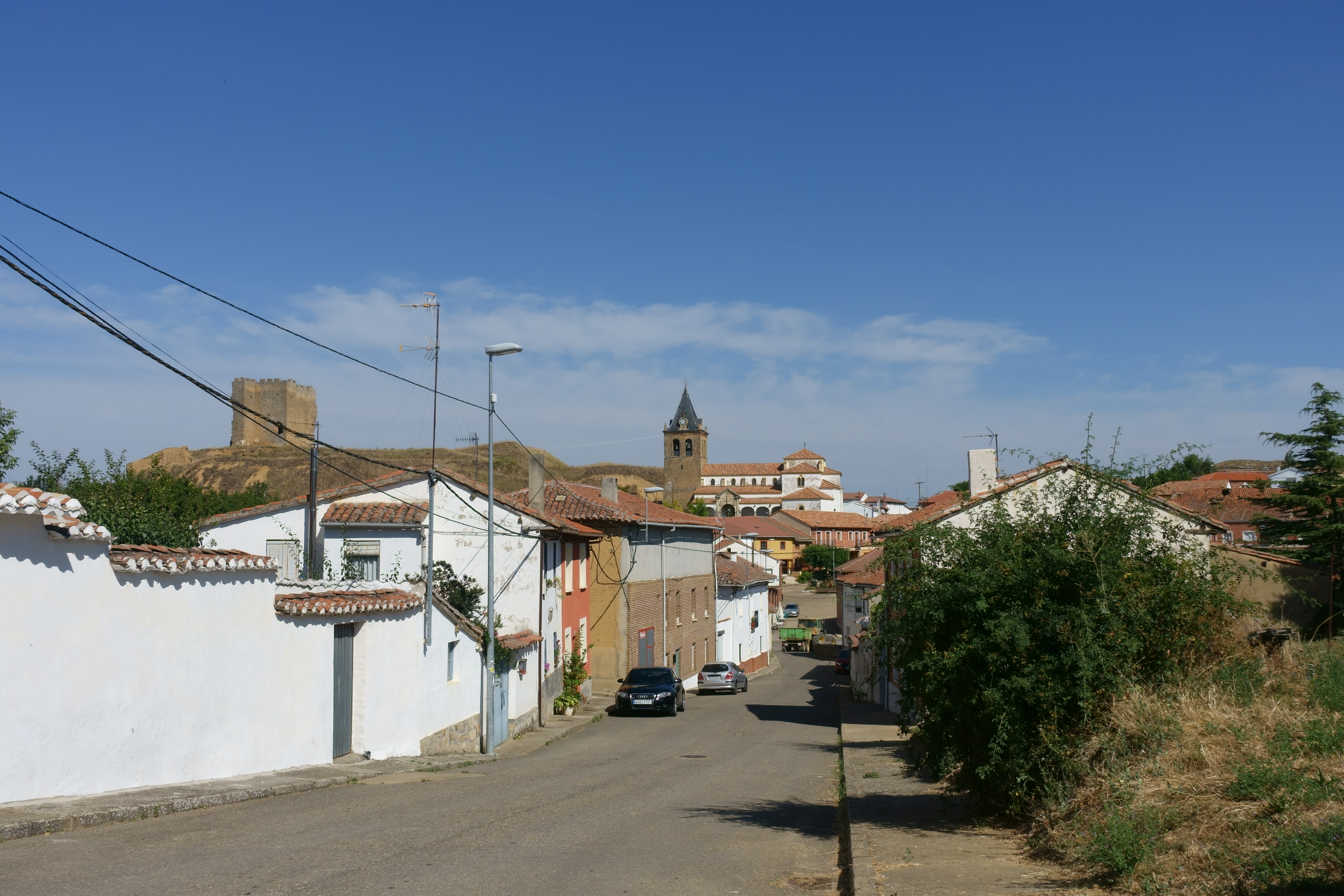

- Flag Coat of arms

- Location within Spain
- Coordinates: 42°27′45″N 5°0′46″W
- Country: Spain
- Autonomous community: Castile and León
- Province: León
- Municipality: Cea

Government
  - Mayor: Ángeles García Rodríguez (PP)

Area
  - Total: 112.34 km^{2} (43.37 sq mi)
- Elevation: 836 m (2,743 ft)

Population (2025-01-01)
  - Total: 373
  - Density: 3.32/km^{2} (8.60/sq mi)
- Time zone: UTC+1 (CET)
  - Summer (DST): UTC+2 (CEST)
- Postal Code: 24174
- Telephone prefix: 987
- Climate: Cfb
- Website: Ayto. de Cea

Cea (Spanish pronunciation: [ˈθea], rarely Ceia) is a municipality located in the province of León, Castile and León, Spain. According to the 2010 census (INE), the municipality has a population of 530 inhabitants.

Historically, there was a Sephardic Jewish community in Cea, first recorded in 1110. Most of the Jews maintained professions in agriculture. In 1492, the community fled during the expulsion of the Jews from Spain. Cea is mentioned in the 10th century text Nodicia de kesos.

== Villages ==
- Bustillo de Cea
- Saelices del Río
- San Pedro de Valderaduey
