= Castrillo de Don Juan =

Coordinates: 41°48′N 4°04′W

- municipality
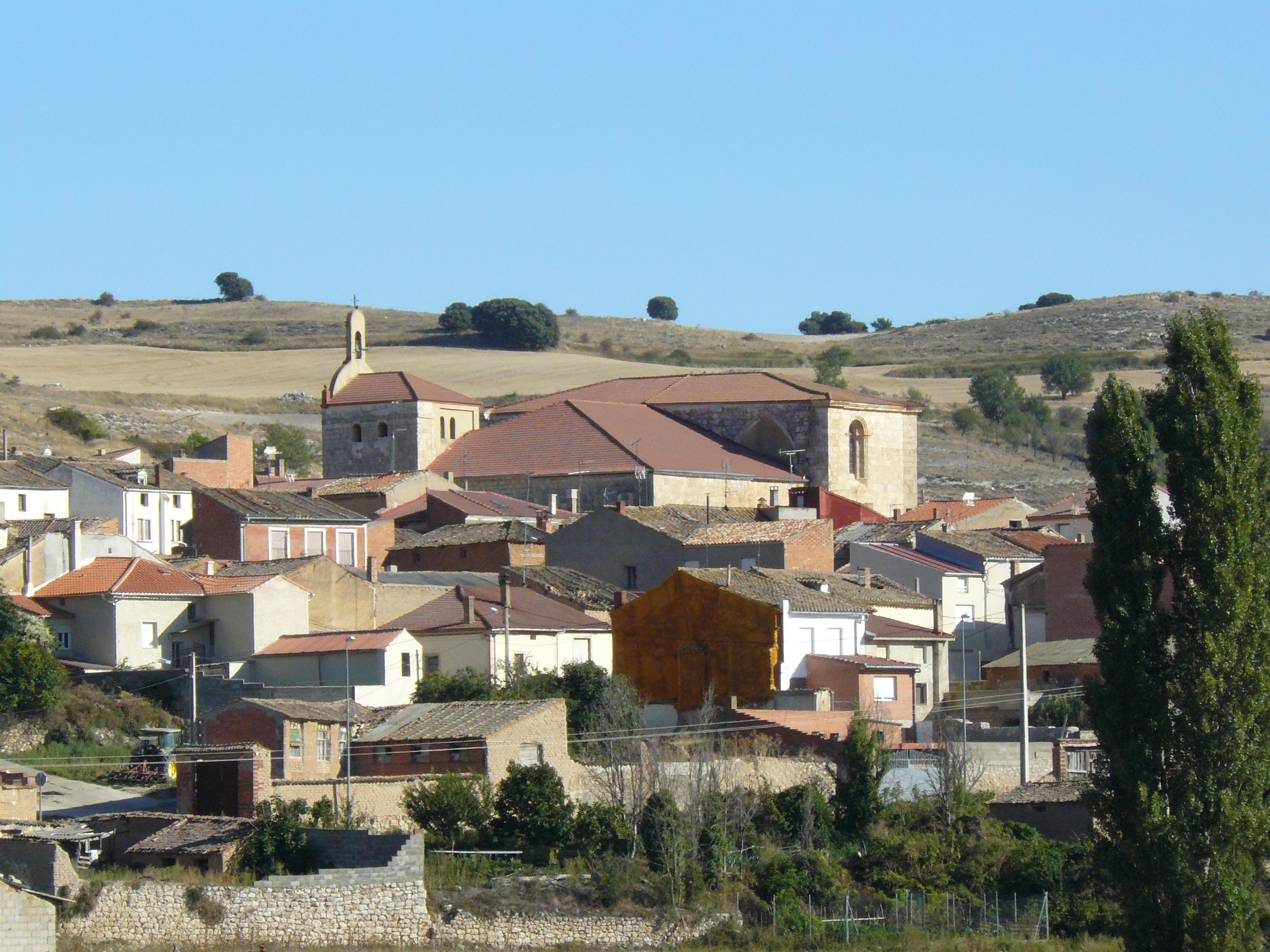

- Flag Coat of arms
- Interactive map of Castrillo de Don Juan
- Country: Spain
- Autonomous community: Castile and León
- Province: Palencia
- Municipality: Castrillo de Don Juan

Area
  - Total: 49 km^{2} (19 sq mi)

Population (2025-01-01)
  - Total: 177
  - Density: 3.6/km^{2} (9.4/sq mi)
- Time zone: UTC+1 (CET)
  - Summer (DST): UTC+2 (CEST)
- Website: Official website

Castrillo de Don Juan is a municipality located in the province of Palencia, Castile and León, Spain. According to the 2004 census (INE), the municipality has a population of 305 inhabitants.
