= Castrejón de Trabancos =

Village in Valladolid, Castile-Leon, Spain

Coordinates: 41°15′10″N 5°10′14″W

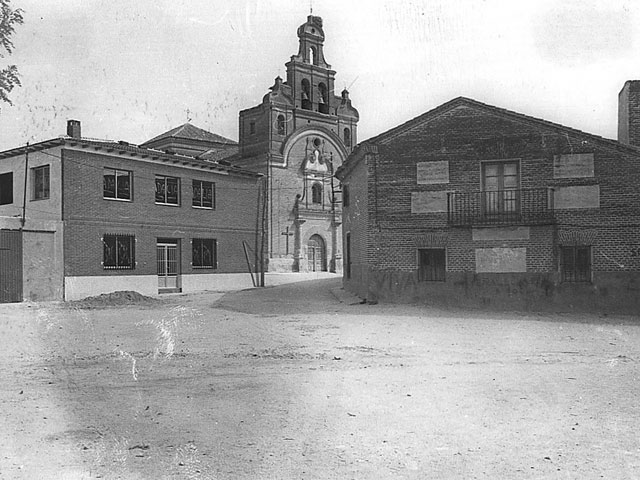

Flag of Castrejón de Trabancos

Coat of arms of Castrejón de Trabancos

Castrejón de Trabancos is a village in Valladolid, Castile-Leon, Spain. The municipality covers an area of 30.2 square kilometres (11.7 sq mi) and as of 2011 had a population of 217 people.
