= Cisneros, Palencia =

Coordinates: 42°13′N 4°51′W

Cisneros
- municipality
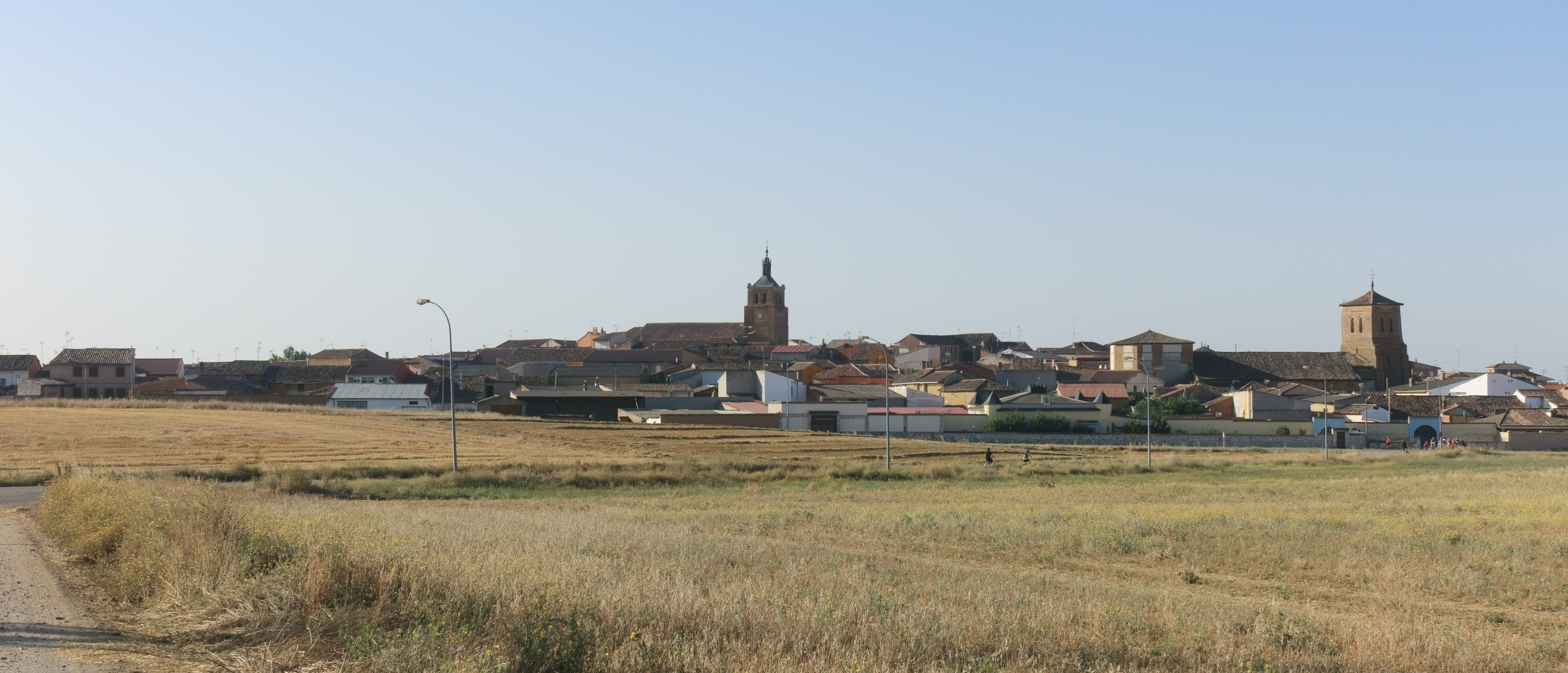

- Flag Coat of arms
- Interactive map of Cisneros
- Country: Spain
- Autonomous community: Castile and León
- Province: Palencia
- Municipality: Cisneros

Area
  - Total: 63.29 km^{2} (24.44 sq mi)

Population (2025-01-01)
  - Total: 426
  - Density: 6.73/km^{2} (17.4/sq mi)
- Time zone: UTC+1 (CET)
  - Summer (DST): UTC+2 (CEST)
- Website: Official website

Cisneros is a Spanish municipality belonging to the province of Palencia, in the northern part of the autonomous community of Castile and León.
