= Castrillo de Onielo =

Coordinates: 41°51′N 4°18′W

- municipality
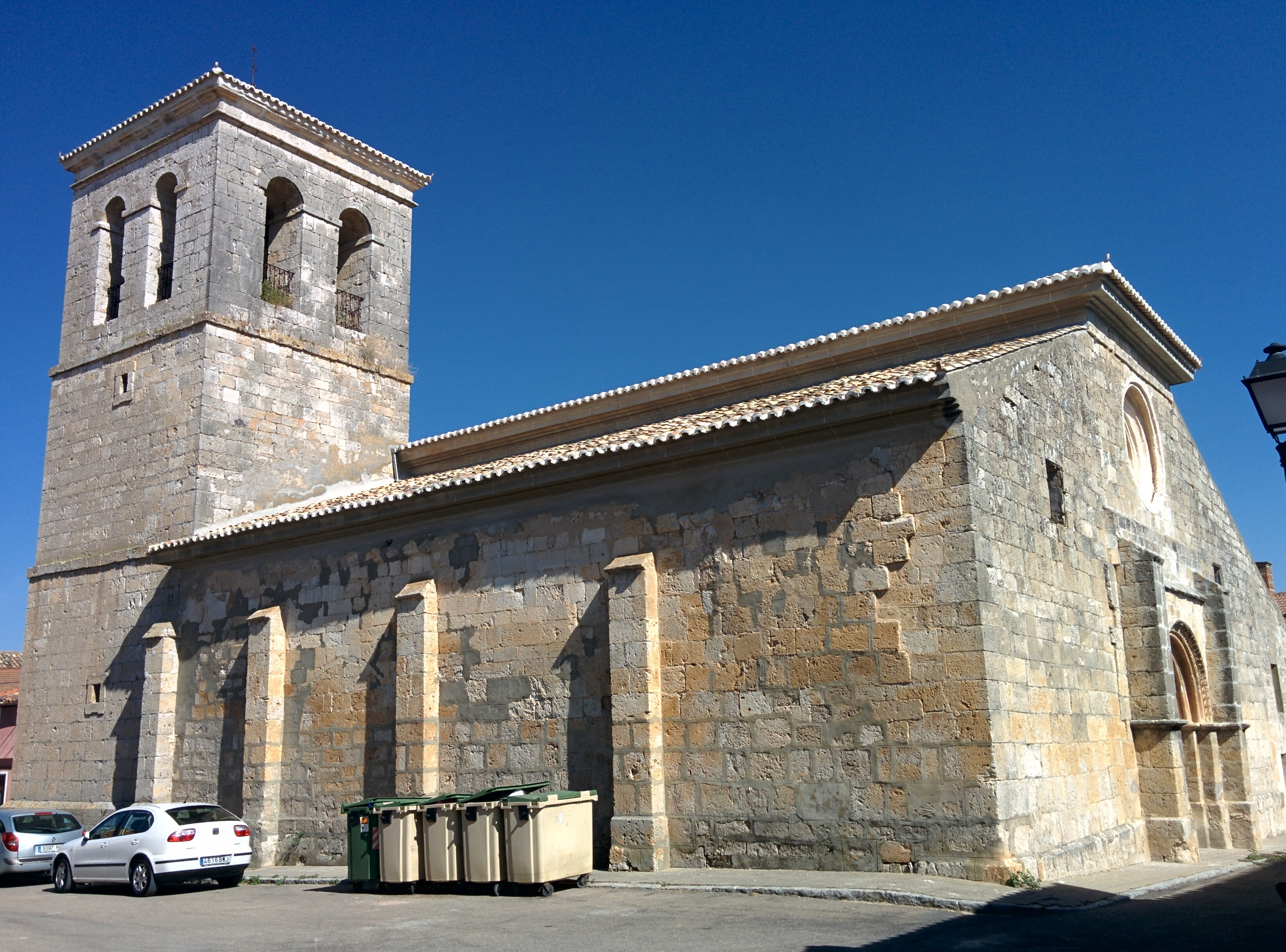
- Interactive map of Castrillo de Onielo
- Country: Spain
- Autonomous community: Castile and León
- Province: Palencia
- Municipality: Castrillo de Onielo

Area
  - Total: 40 km^{2} (15 sq mi)

Population (2025-01-01)
  - Total: 91
  - Density: 2.3/km^{2} (5.9/sq mi)
- Time zone: UTC+1 (CET)
  - Summer (DST): UTC+2 (CEST)
- Website: Official website

Castrillo de Onielo is a municipality located in the province of Palencia, Castile and León, Spain. According to the 2018 census (INE), the municipality has a population of 101 inhabitants.
