= Castrilli =

Castrilli is a surname. Notable people with the surname include:

- Annamarie Castrilli (born 1949), Canadian politician, lawyer, educator, and human rights activist
- Javier Castrilli (born 1957), Argentine football referee
- John Castrilli (born 1950), Australian politician
