= Villamartín de Campos =

Coordinates: 42°01′N 4°40′W

- municipality
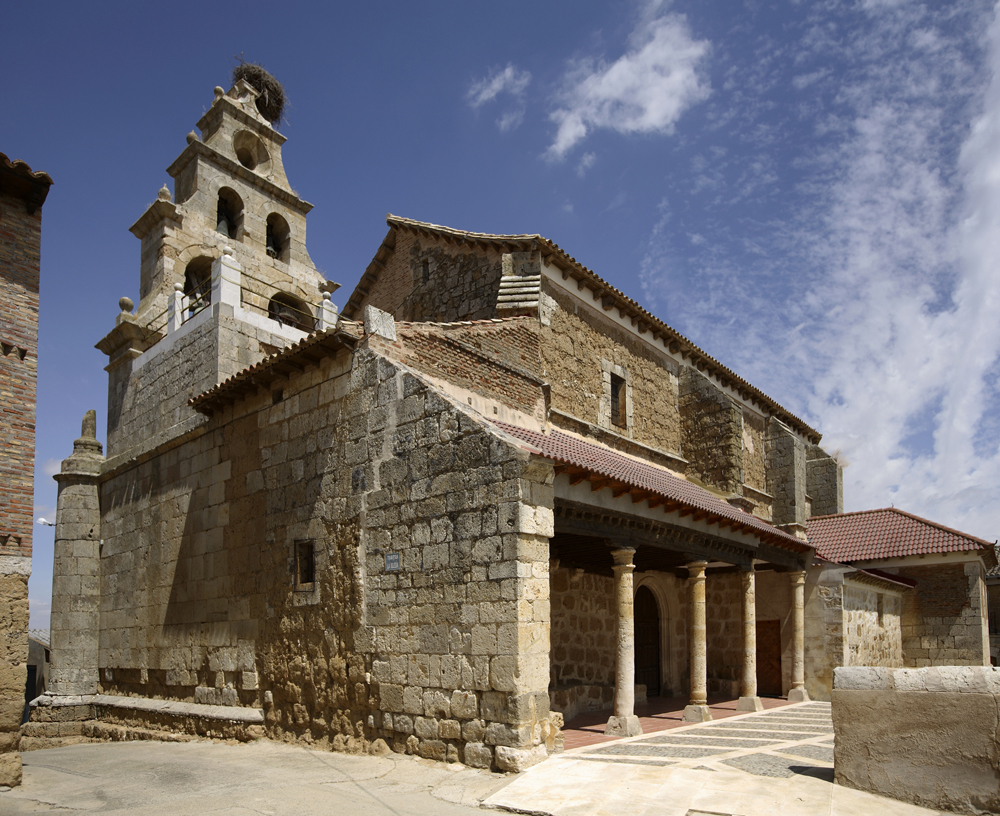

- Coat of arms
- Interactive map of Villamartín de Campos
- Country: Spain
- Autonomous community: Castile and León
- Province: Palencia
- Municipality: Villamartín de Campos

Area
  - Total: 35 km^{2} (14 sq mi)

Population (2025-01-01)
  - Total: 170
  - Density: 4.9/km^{2} (13/sq mi)
- Time zone: UTC+1 (CET)
  - Summer (DST): UTC+2 (CEST)
- Website: Official website

Villamartín de Campos is a municipality in the province of Palencia, Castile and León, Spain. According to the 2004 census (INE), the municipality has a population of 134.
