= Tariego de Cerrato =

Coordinates: 42°47′48″N 4°15′29″W

- municipality
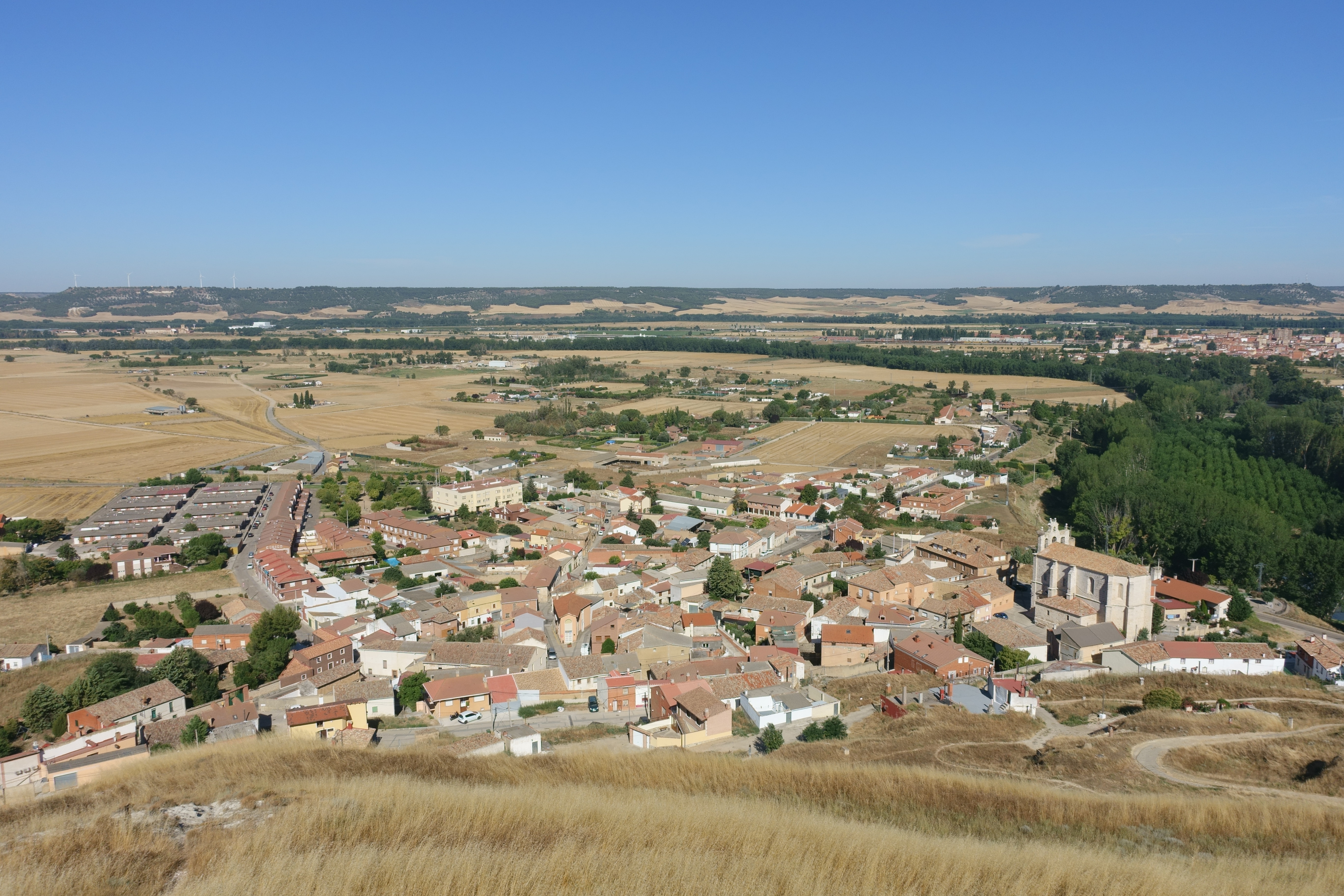

- Coat of arms
- Interactive map of Tariego de Cerrato
- Country: Spain
- Autonomous community: Castile and León
- Province: Palencia
- Municipality: Tariego de Cerrato

Area
  - Total: 20 km^{2} (7.7 sq mi)

Population (2025-01-01)
  - Total: 504
  - Density: 25/km^{2} (65/sq mi)
- Time zone: UTC+1 (CET)
  - Summer (DST): UTC+2 (CEST)
- Website: Official website

Tariego de Cerrato is a municipality located in the province of Palencia, Castile and León, Spain. According to the 2018 census (INE), the municipality has a population of 490 inhabitants.
