= Castrillo de la Guareña =

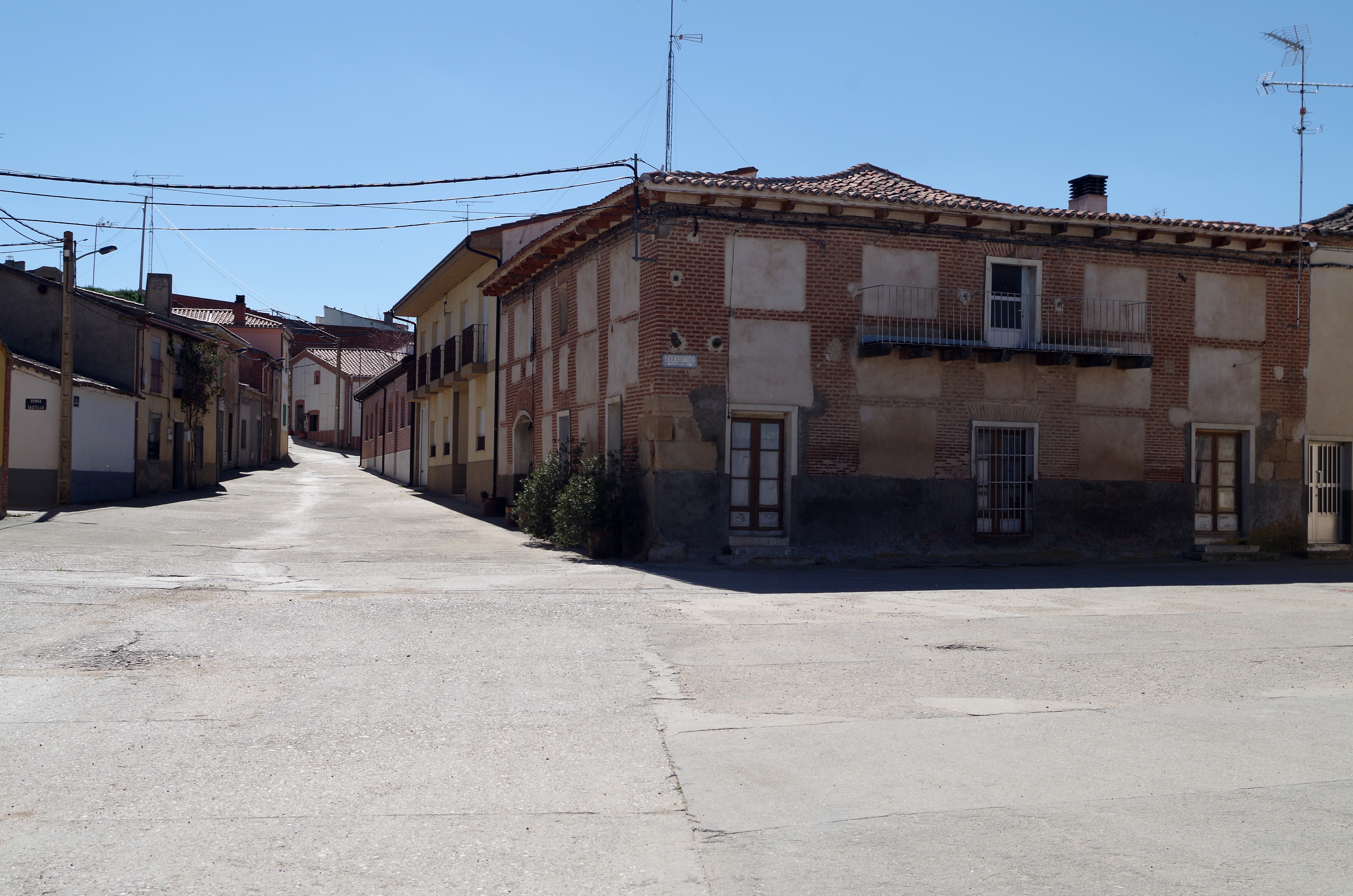

- Flag Coat of arms

- Spain
- Coordinates: 41°13′49″N 5°19′25″W
- Country: Spain
- Autonomous community: Castile and León
- Province: Zamora
- Comarca: La Guareña

Government
  - Mayor: Ana María González Santos

Area
  - Total: 21.91 km^{2} (8.46 sq mi)

Population (2025-01-01)
  - Total: 133
  - Density: 6.07/km^{2} (15.7/sq mi)
- Demonym: Castrillejos
- Time zone: UTC+1 (CET)
  - Summer (DST): UTC+2 (CEST)

Castrillo de la Guareña is a municipality located in the province of Zamora, Castile and León, Spain.
