= TUSSAM =

Bus company in Seville, Spain

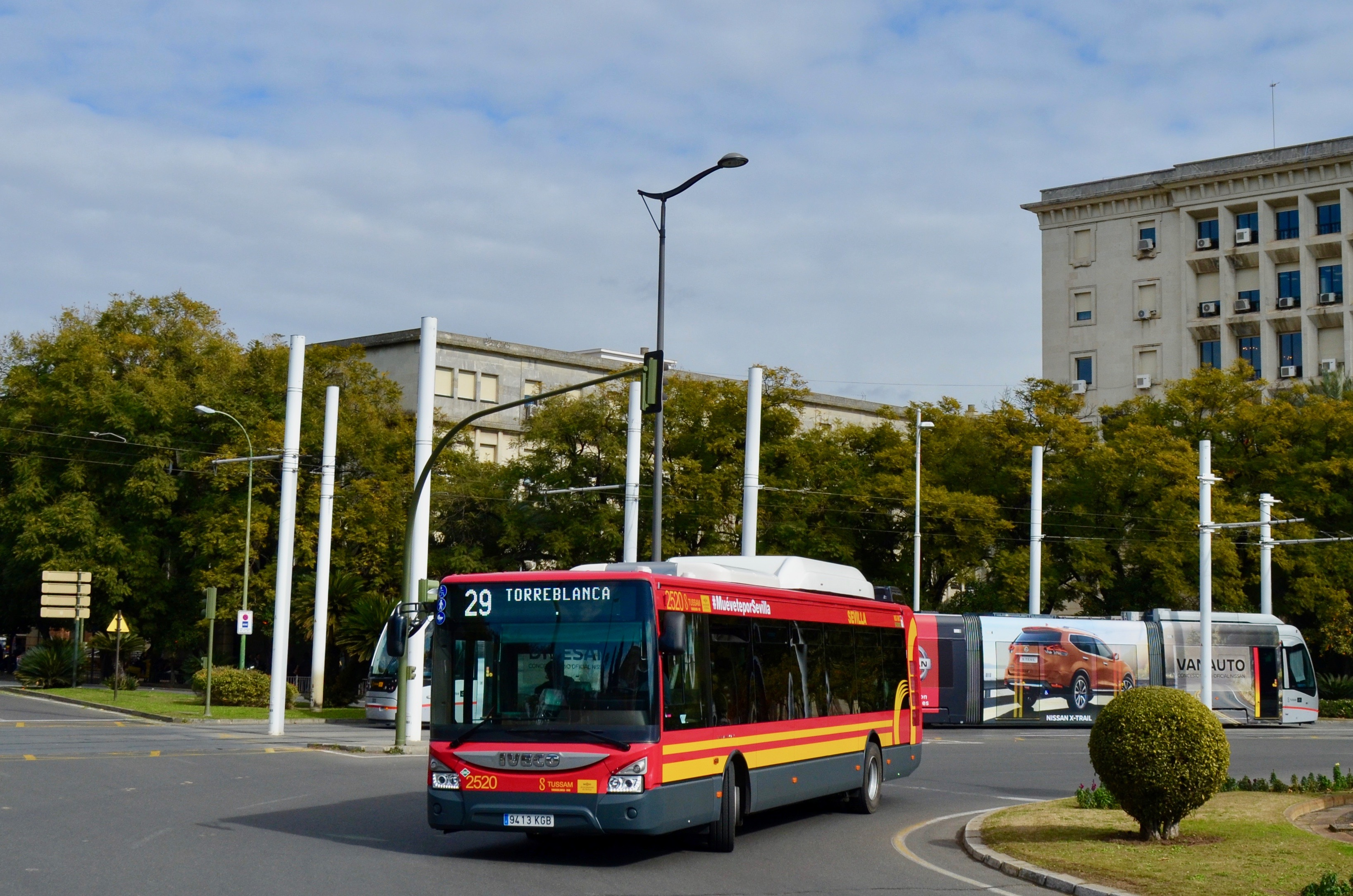
- Line 28 bus and Metrocentro at Prado de San Sebastián
- Parent: Seville City Hall
- Founded: 4 November 1975
- Service area: Seville
- Service type: Bus transport network
- Routes: 45 day routes 10 night routes 2 special lines 1 tram train line
- Fleet: 450 buses and 6 tram trains (2024)
- Daily ridership: 86.77 million (2024)
- Website: www.tussam.es

Transportes Urbanos de Sevilla, Sociedad Autónoma Municipal (Spanish for Seville Urban Transportation, Municipal Autonomous Corporation), popularly known as TUSSAM, is a public-owned company that manages bus routes and Seville tramway in Seville, Spain.

TUSSAM operates 59 routes extending over 680 km. It carried over 86 million passengers in 2024.

== History ==
TUSSAM was founded on November 4, 1975 from a split in the Servicio Municipal de Transportes Urbanos (SMTU). The first buses purchased by TUSSAM arrived in 1977, the Enasa Pegaso 6035. Initially, the buses were blue on the bottom and cream on the top. Some models included a red stripe in the middle.

In 1982, the use of the bonobús was introduced, becoming a pioneer in Spain in the use of this system on buses. That same year, the fleet was renewed with the Pegaso 6038. Between 1986 and 1987, the Exploitation Assistance System was incorporated, which allowed the location of the buses to be known in real time. In 1987, the fleet was renewed with buses manufactured by Renault, inaugurating a new image characterized by the "Seville orange" color. In 1989, the bonobuses became card-shaped, and the transfer option was introduced. In 1998, new Iveco bus were acquired.

In the 2000s, TUSSAM suffered severe financial losses. In 2001, it lost €27 million. By mid-2004, its accumulated debt had risen to over €60 million. In 2007, the debt had reached €137 million. To alleviate this debt, Seville City Council eliminated the non-transferable bus pass at the beginning of 2005, leaving only the higher-priced one-way bus option. This, which represented a 28% price increase, sparked protests from consumer and environmental organizations. Due to the reduction in passenger numbers as a result of this measure, the following year TUSSAM resumed selling the non-transferable bus pass, with an 8% price increase compared to the previous year. In the following years, TUSSAM continued to lose passengers.

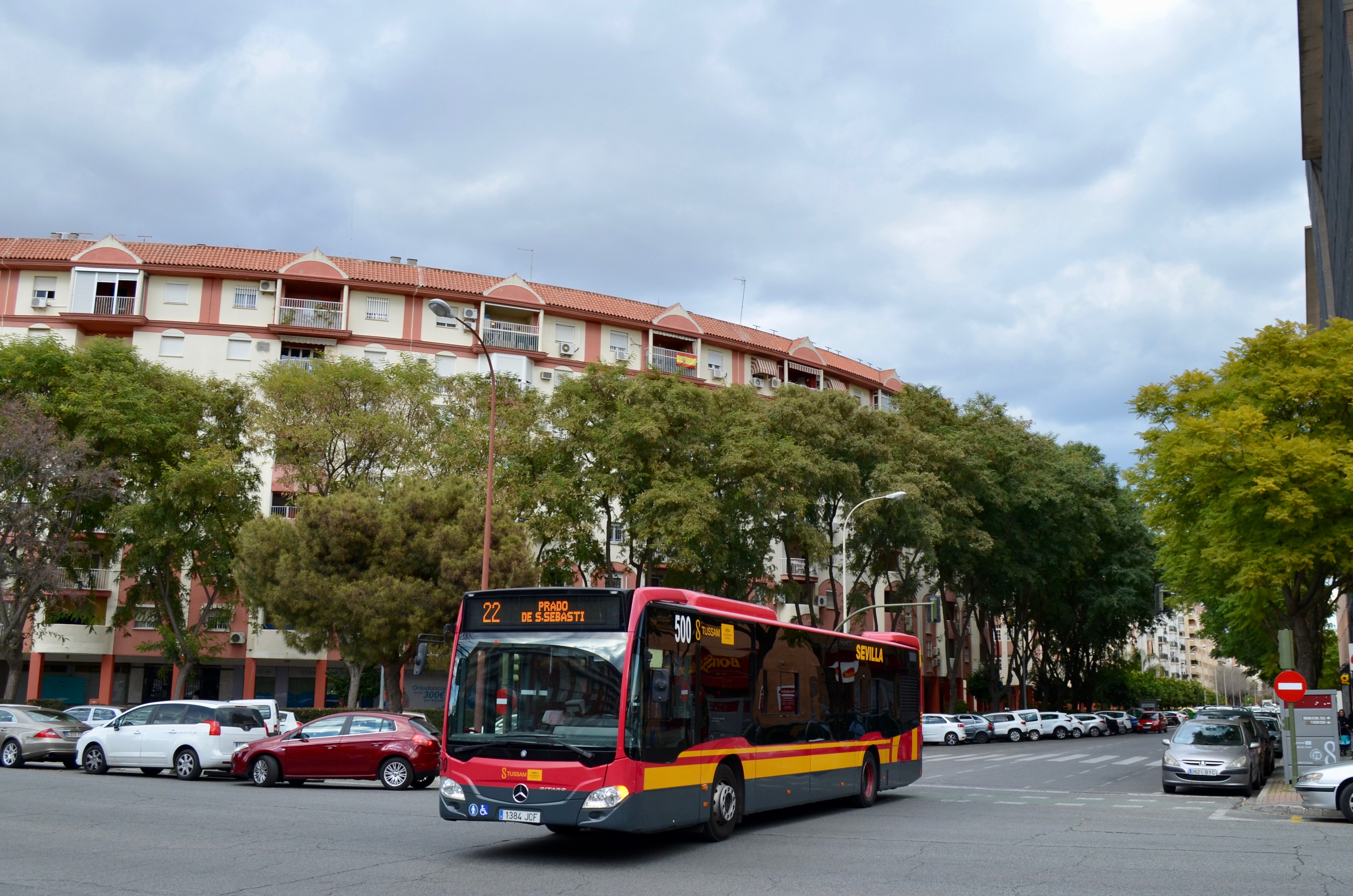
Line 22

TUSSAM hired its first female driver in 2001. A year later, in 2002, it renewed its image again, choosing the crimson and gold colors, symbols that appear on the Flag of Seville. The new image was selected by competition among students of the School of Fine Arts, whose winner was Ana Rocío Maraver Tello. In 2004 TUSSAM began a renovation of the waiting canopies, changing their color from orange to maroon. That same year, the first information points of the waiting times began to be installed at the stops.

Seville's tram service, known as Metrocentro, was inaugurated on 28 October 2007 between Plaza Nueva and Prado de San Sebastián. In 2011, the tram debuted a new look and was extended to San Bernardo. In 2024, three new stops were inaugurated in the so-called "extension to Nervion".

In 2009, the cards incorporated a contactless ticketing system. In 2012, TUSSAM again slightly revamped the image of the buses, using the slogan #Déjatellevar (along with #MuéveteporSevilla, starting in 2015). That same year, TUSSAM began managing the Special Airport Line (EA). TUSSAM began managing the Prado de San Sebastián Bus Station in 2013.

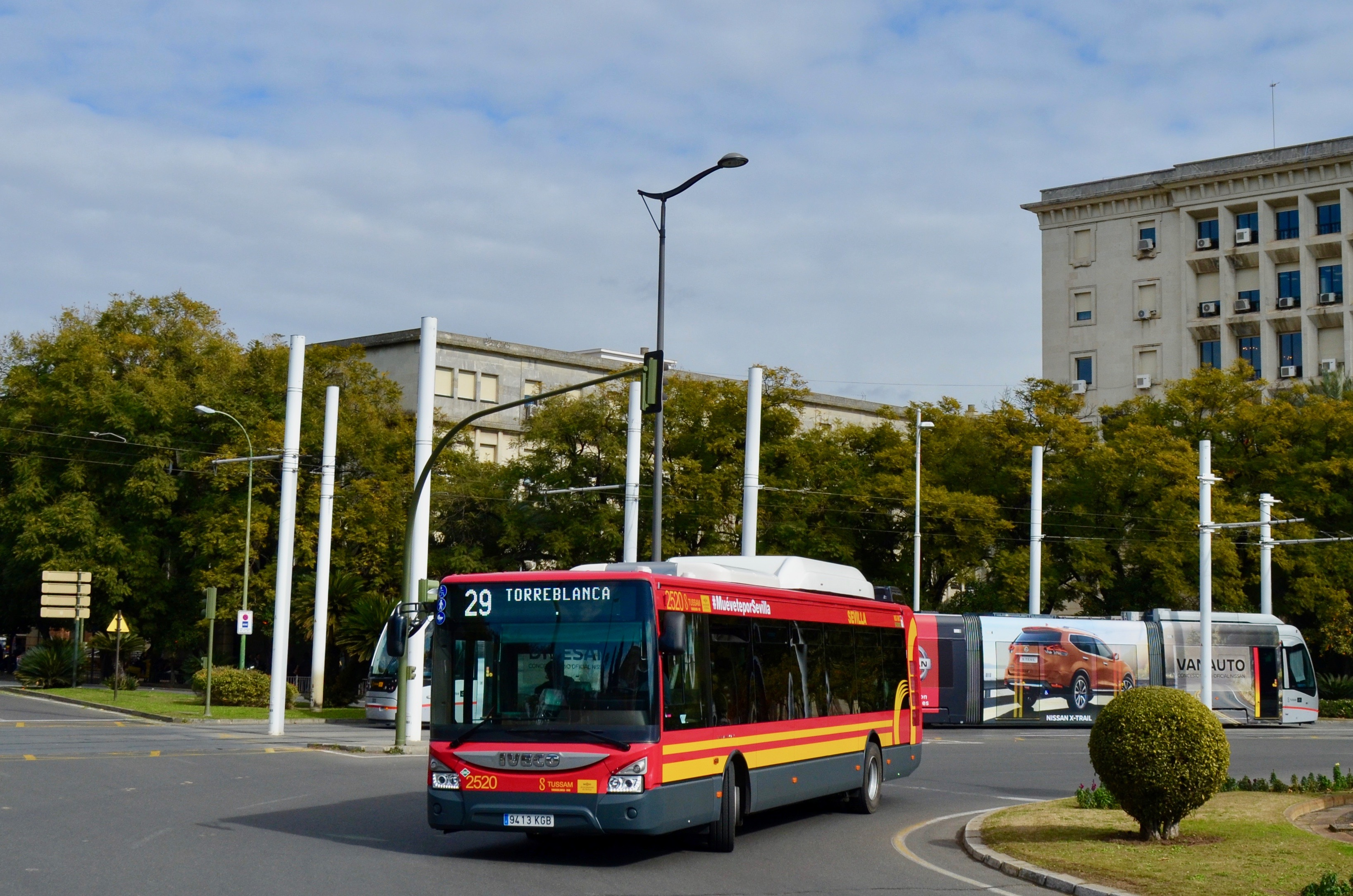
Line 29

The mobile app, AppTUSSAM, was launched in 2013, allowing users to access the route map, real-time bus locations, and expected wait times for each stop. A year later, in 2014, online top-ups became available. Between 2015 and 2017, the image of the cards and the AppTUSSAM underwent updates, most notably the introduction of the Social Card.

In 2017, the East Line (LE), the service's first express line, was created, connecting the Seville East district with Prado de San Sebastián. The North Line (LN) would be added in 2018, doing the same with Pino Montano, and the South Line (LS) in 2021, connecting with Bellavista.

Since 2019, the entire bus fleet has been equipped with free Wi-Fi.

On October 30, 2024, line 35 was abolished and replaced by line CJ, due to the relocation of the first judicial bodies to the new City of Justice in Palmas Altas. On January 22, 2024, one of the terminals was extended from Prado de San Sebastián to San Bernardo.

On February 3, 2025, service on line C5 was restored, consisting of four electric minibuses with 21 seats each. The line had been suspended since December 2019, when one of the minibuses had an accident in the Plaza del Duque and left a dozen people injured.

On September 29, 2025, the first Tramvibús line (TB1) will be inaugurated, connecting Nervión with Seville East and Torreblanca. This line has its own segregated lane, consisting of ten vehicles that reach a commercial speed of between 22 and 25 kilometers per hour, twice the usual speed. On November 17, 2025, another bus line will be inaugurated, connecting Seville East with the Virgen Macarena University Hospital.

== Routes ==
TUSSAM consists of a network of 45 routes, of which 41 are publicly operated. Four routes are operated by Casal SL. TUSSAM also operates eight night lines; two special lines that only provide service during Seville Fair; as well as a tram line. Overall, the service covers close to 700 kilometers, with an average commercial speed of 12.65 km/h.

TUSSAM routes are divided in several categories.

- Single-digit routes are cross-town routes (Spanish: líneas transversales)
- Two-digit routes starting with 1, 2, 3 and 4 head north, east, south and west, respectively.
- Two-digit routes starting with 5 head to suburbs.
- Routes starting with an L (as well as Route CJ) are express-route services.
- Routes starting with a C are loop-routes (Spanish: líneas circulares).
- Routes starting with an A are night routes (Spanish: líneas nocturnas). They all reach Prado and operate from 00:00 to 05:00.
- Routes starting with an E are special-service routes (Spanish: servicios especiales). These include the Airport Line (EA) and the Seville Fair lines and need their own special ticket to be used.

=== Loop routes ===
Route	Description	Ridership (2024)
C1	External Loop Route: Prado - Triana - Cartuja Island - Barqueta Bridge - Santa Justa Railway Station	3.405.098
C2	External Loop Route: Prado - Santa Justa Railway Station - Barqueta Bridge - Cartuja Island - Triana	3.191.573
C3	Internal Loop Route: Prado - Plaza de Armas Bus Station - Barqueta	2.256.211
C4	Internal Loop Route: Prado - Barqueta Bridge - Plaza de Armas Bus Station	1.694.562
C5	Old Town Loop Route: Prado - Plaza del Duque	-
C6	North Macarena Loop Route: San Jerónimo - Pino Montano - Valdezorras - Aeropuerto Viejo (operated by Casal SL)	521.449

=== Cross-town routes ===
Línea	Trayecto	Pasajeros (2024)
1	Polígono Norte - Prado - Bami	3.589.079
2	Sevilla Tower - Polígono San Pablo - Heliópolis	9.097.438
3	Pino Montano - San Jerónimo - Los Bermejales - Bellavista	4.029.703
5	Sevilla Tower - Prado - Santa Aurelia	2.744.387
6	San Lázaro - Triana - Los Remedios - Virgen del Rocío University Hospital	3.508.323

=== Northern routes ===
Route	Description	Ridership (2024)
10	Ponce de León - San Jerónimo	1.842.049
11	Ponce de León - Macarena	866.473
12	Ponce de León - Pino Montano	2.816.461
13	Plaza del Duque - Pino Montano	3.944.112
14	Plaza del Duque - Las Golondrinas - Macarena	888.725
15	San Diego - Plaza Jerónimo de Córdoba	884.232
16	Valdezorras - Plaza Jerónimo de Córdoba (operated by Casal SL)	521.449

=== Eastern routes ===
Route	Description	Ridership(2024)
20	Ponce de León - Polígono de San Pablo	936.159
21	Plaza de Armas Bus Station - Polígono de San Pablo	1.788.719
22	Prado - Sevilla Este	2.104.529
24	Ponce de León - La Negrilla - Rochelambert	2.403.180
25	Prado - Rochelambert	914.451
26	Prado - Cerro del Águila	1.311.494
27	Ponce de León - Sevilla Este	5.132.157
28	Prado - Parque Alcosa	2.218.523
29	Prado - Torreblanca(operated by Casal SL)	2.442.615

=== Southern routes ===
Route	Description	Ridership (2024)
30	Prado - Las Letanías	669.162
31	Prado - Polígono Sur	578.166
32	Polígono Sur - Ponce de León	3.776.835
34	Prado - Los Bermejales	981.282
37	Bellavista - Puerta Jerez	2.359.041
38	Pablo - Pablo de Olavide University	270.330
39	Palmete - Hacienda San Antonio - Los Arcos (operated by Casal SL)	2.442.615

=== Western routes ===
Route	Description	Ridership (2024)
40	Reyes Católicos - El Tardón	416.701
41	Reyes Católicos - Tablada	530.188
43	San Pablo - El Carmen	527.650

=== Suburban routes ===
Route	Description	Ridership (2024)
52	San Bernardo Railway Station - Palmete	1.073.846
53	Los Arcos - Sevilla I Prison	6.301

=== Neighborhoods and express routes ===
Route	Description	Ridership (2024)
B3	Nervión - Santa Clara	181.197
B4	San Bernardo Railway Station - Parque Alcosa - Torreblanca	1.245.052
CJ	San Bernardo Railway Station - Ciudad de la Justicia	357.383
LE	Prado - Sevilla Este	1.101.658
LN	Prado - Pino Montano	1.569.750
LS	Santa Justa Railway Station - Bellavista	637.561

=== Tram bus ===
Route	Description	Ridership (2025)
TB1	Nervión - Sevilla Este - Torreblanca	-

=== Tramway ===
Route	Description	Ridership (2024)
T1	Luis de Morales - Plaza Nueva	3.497.619

=== Special services ===
Route	Description	Ridership (2024)
EA	Seville Airport - Santa Justa Railway Station - Plaza de Armas Bus Station	1.317.442
E0	Prado - Real de la Feria (during Seville Fair)	415.793
E5	Charco de la Pava - Real de la Feria (during Seville Fair)	415.793

=== Night buses ===
Route	Description	Ridership (2024)
A1	Prado - Polígono Norte - Pino Montano	447.699
A2	Prado - Puerta Jerez - San Jerónimo	447.699
A3	Prado - Los Arcos - Sevilla Este	447.699
A4	Prado - Santa Aurelia - Palmete - Rochelambert	447.699
A5	Prado - El Cerro del Águila - Polígono Sur	447.699
A6	Prado - Los Bermejales - Bellavista	447.699
A7	Prado - Los Remedios - Triana - Plaza del Duque - Santa Justa Railway Station (Night loop route)	447.699
A8	Prado - San Pablo - Parque Alcosa	447.699

=== Former lines ===
Route	Description	Details
23	Prado - Santa Aurelia	Replaced by Route 5 in 2010.
33	Pedro Salvador - Plaza Nueva	Merged into Route 37 in 2008.
35	Prado - Palmas Altas	Replaced by Route CJ in 2023
36	Prado - Pablo de Olavide University	Service ended in 2010. Metro de Sevilla covers most of its route. Route 38 serves the University since 2011.
42	Tablada - Plaza Nueva	Merged into Route 41.
50	Gran Plaza - Santa Clara	Replaced by Route B3.
55	Gran Plaza - Parque Alcosa	Replaced by Route B4.
70	Prado - Parque Alcosa	Replaced by Route 28. Former contracted route.
71	Torreblanca - Luis de Morales	Replaced by Route 29. Former contracted route.
72	Prado - Bellavista	Replaced by Route 37. Former contracted route.
73	Valdezorras - Gordillo	Replaced by Routes C6A and C6B. Former contracted route.
C7	Triana loop route	Service ended in 2010 after operating for only one month due to low ridership.
E5	Barqueta - Alamillo	Service ended in 2010 due to low ridership. This route only operated on weekends.

== Operations ==
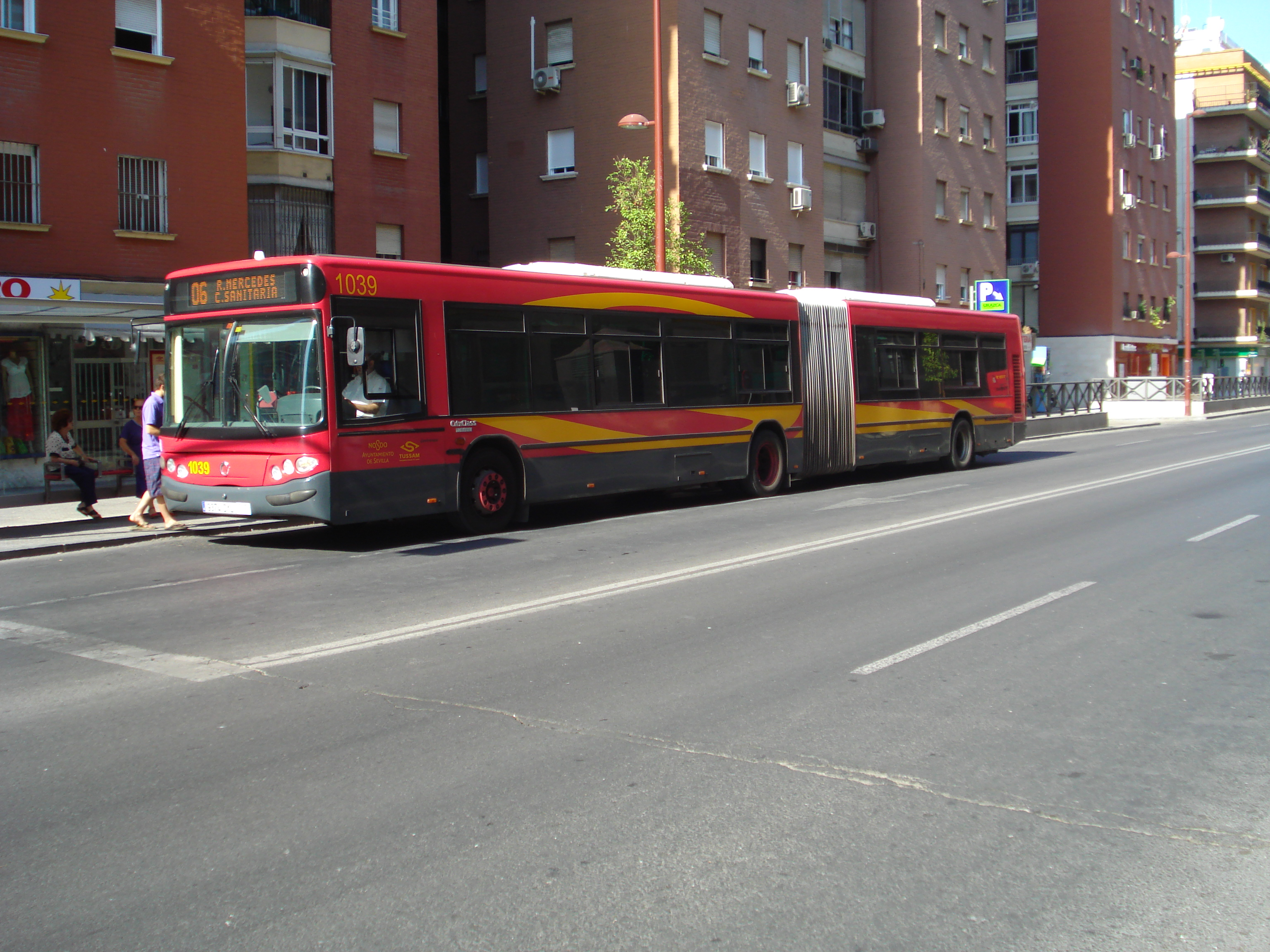
TUSSAM articulated city bus

As of December 31, 2010, TUSSAM owned a total of 374 vehicles. The fleet composition is as follows:

=== By fuel ===
- 56.96% (213): Biodiesel
- 41.44% (155): Compressed natural gas
- 0.53% (2): Bioethanol
- 1.07% (4): Electric

=== By dimension ===
- 72.73% (272): Standard bus (12 meters)
- 23.26% (87): Articulated bus (18 meters)
- 2.14% (8): Midibus (8 meters)
- 1.87% (7): Minibus (7 meters)

=== By vehicle accessibility ===
- 70.32% (263): Low floor with automatic ramp
- 28.88% (108): Low floor with automatic and manual ramp
- 0.80% (3): Low floor without ramp
