= Plaza de San Francisco, Seville =

Square in Seville, Spain

Coordinates: 37.3885°N 5.9939°W

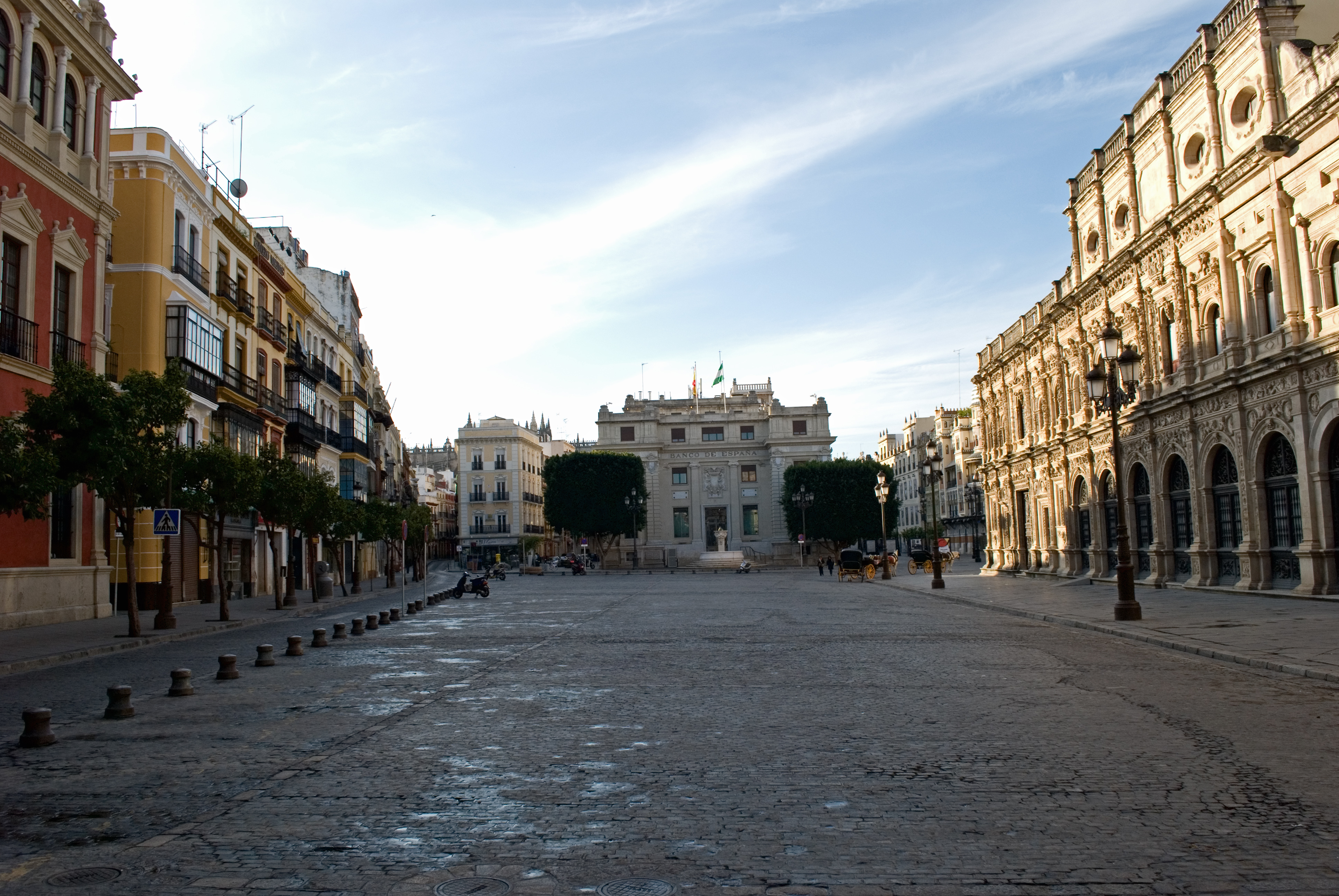
Plaza de San Francisco viewed from the North, 2009. The Ayuntamiento is on the right; the Banco de España is in the middle.

Plaza de San Francisco (lit. 'Saint Francis Square') is a square in the Casco Antiguo of Seville, Spain. The Ayuntamiento (City Hall), known as Casa consistorial de Sevilla, built in the 16th century, runs along the entire western side of the square. On the other side of the City Hall is the Plaza Nueva. Both plazas are connected to the Avenida de la Constitución.

== History ==
By the time Seville was reconquered by the Crown of Castile in 1248, a square was already present in this space. It was named Plaza de San Francisco after the Convento de San Francisco, which was the main access to the square between 1268 and 1840. A fish market used to be present in the west side, before the City Hall was built in the 16th century.

Part of the hithertho unlocated Roman walls of Romula Hispalis (3rd century AD) were discovered in the plaza in 2021 during the building works of a hotel.

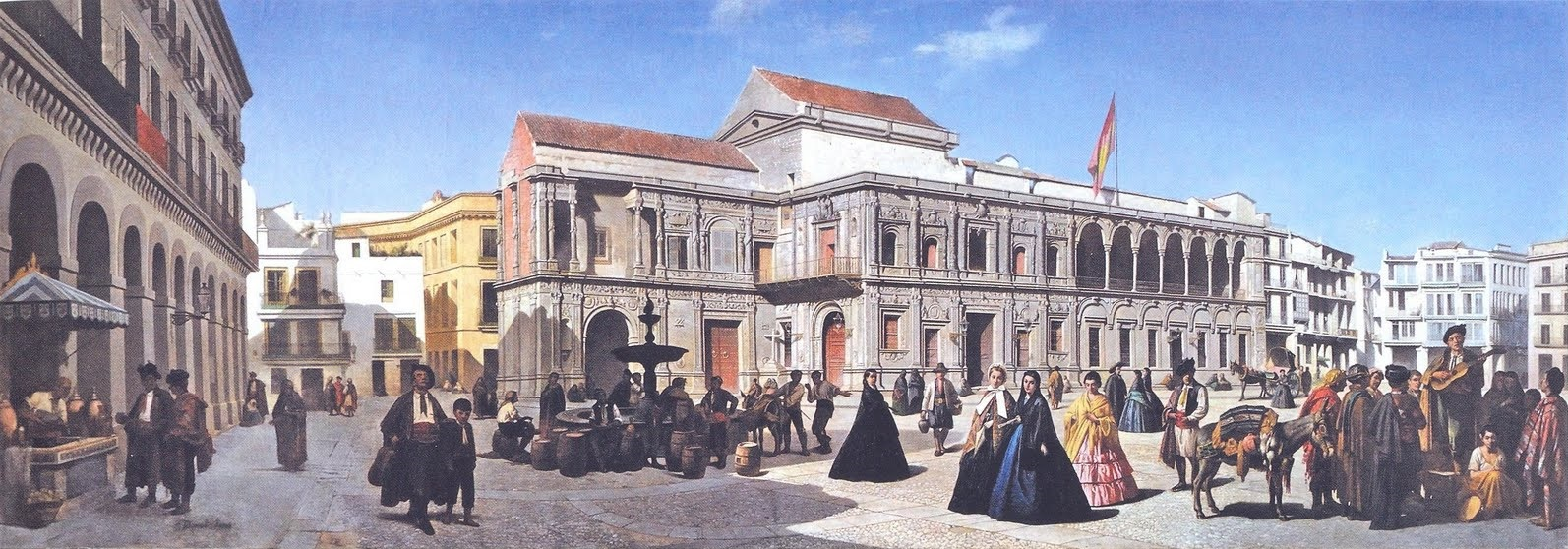
Plaza de San Francisco viewed from the South-East, 1850.
