= Plaza de Armas (bus station) =

Bus station in Seville, Spain

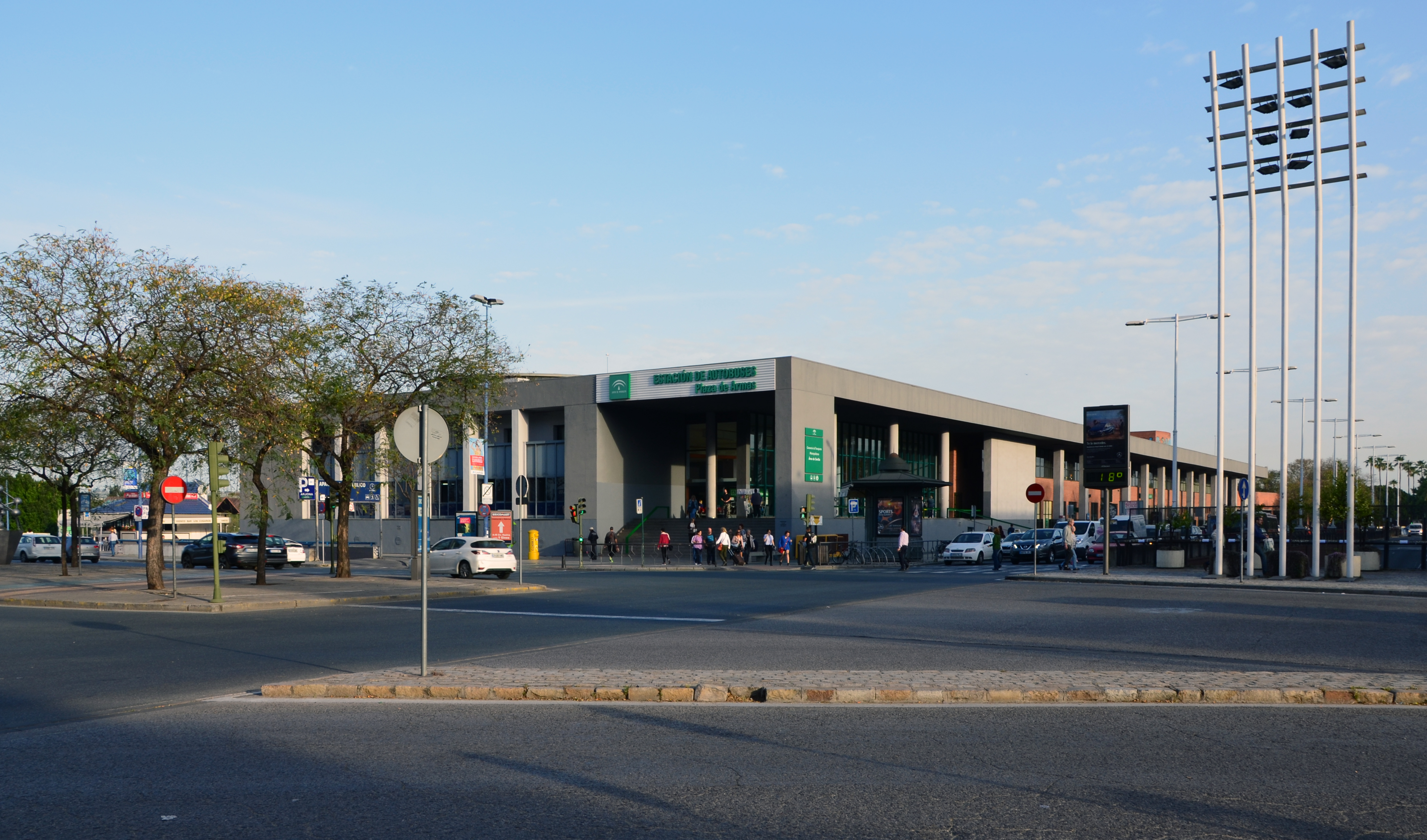
- Plaza de Armas, April 2017

General information
- Location: Avenida Cristo de la Expiración, Casco Antiguo, Seville; Andalusia, Spain
- Coordinates: 37°23′29″N 6°00′13″W
- System: bus station

History
- Opened: 1992
Location

Plaza de Armas (English: Barrack Square) is an international bus station of the city of Seville. It is located at the intersection of the avenue Cristo de la Expiración and Torneo St., in the district of Casco Antiguo. It was opened in 1992.

== Services ==
- Metropolitan services: About thirty bus lines serve the Aljarafe (west of Seville metropolitan area) from the station. Those buses are identified by its olive color, and users of them can transfer to TUSSAM (Seville urban buses) lines that stop just outside the station (and vice versa) as they are integrated in the Seville Transport Consortium.
- Provincial / regional services: Connections with the Sierra Norte and the provinces of Almería, Córdoba, Granada, Huelva, Jaén and Málaga.
- National services: Connections with the Autonomous Communities of Valencia, Catalonia, Extremadura, Madrid, Galicia, Basque Country, Murcia, Asturias and Castilla-León.
- International services: Connections with France, Belgium, Holland, Germany, Portugal, Romania and Morocco.
- Airport Express: A line that links the center of Seville with its airport start / ends at the station. It takes about 35 minutes.

About 1,500 buses operated by 20 companies enter or exit the station every day. In addition, several TUSSAM lines stop outside the station.

== Metro (in planning phase) ==
Is expected that in the future, Plaza de Armas will be also a metro station of line 2 of the Seville Metro (still in planning phase), that will be located between the stations of Torre Triana and Plaza del Duque on the same line.

Service of Metro at this station
<< Toward	< Preceding	Line	Following >	Toward >>
Torre Triana			Plaza del Duque	Parque Tecnológico

== See also ==
- List of Seville metro stations
