= Plaza Nueva, Seville =

Square in Seville, Spain

Plaza Nueva
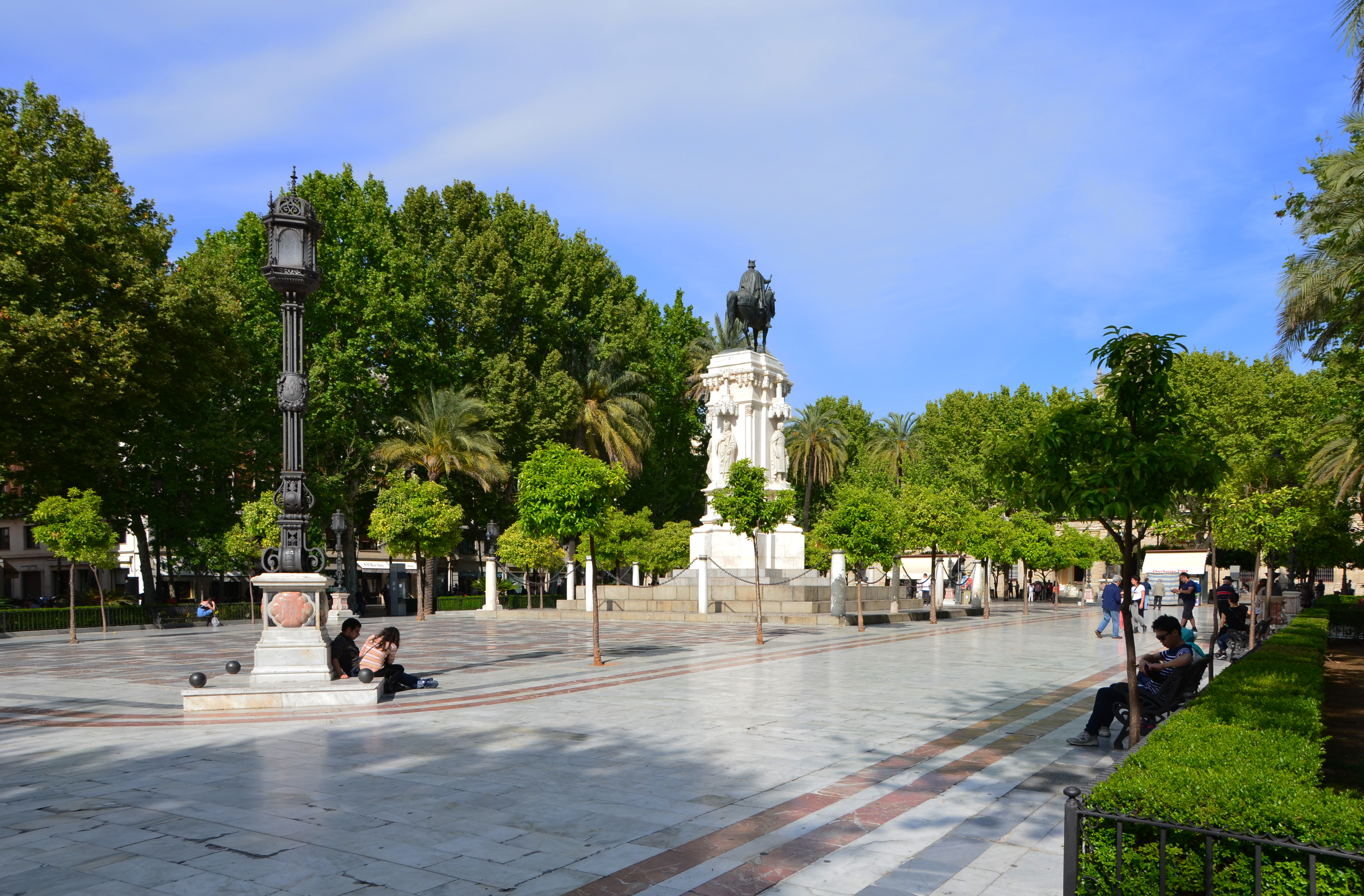

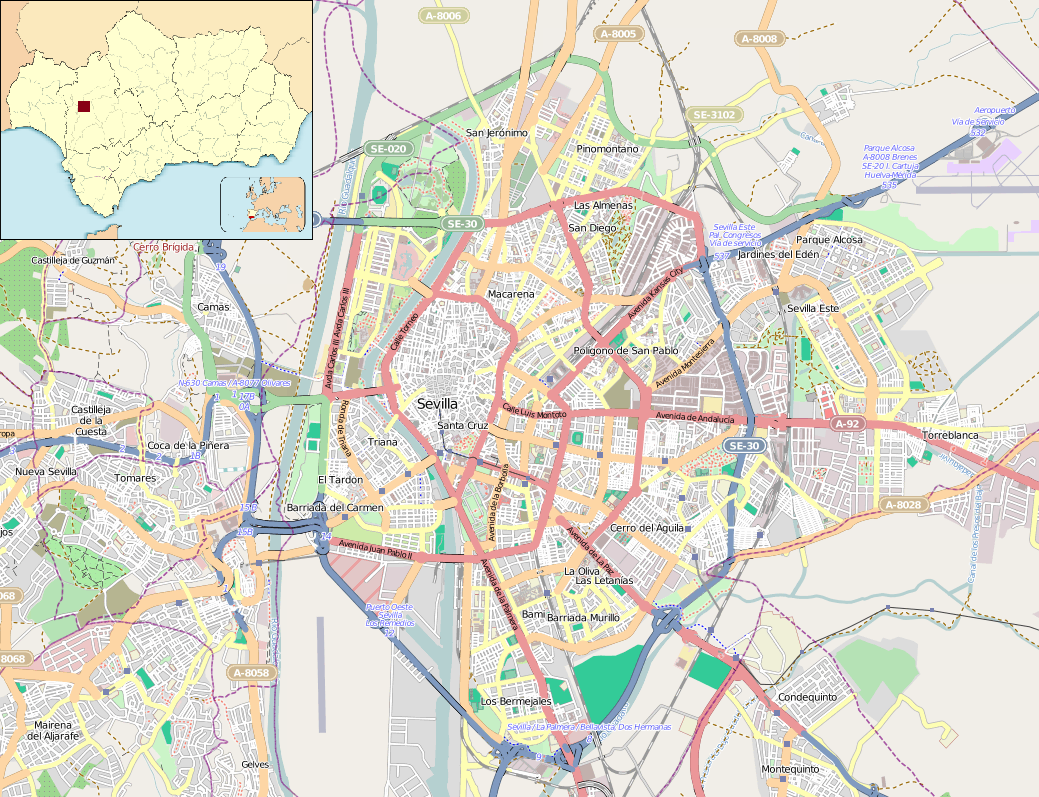
- Location within Seville
- Former names: Plaza Nueva (1854–1857) Plaza de la Infanta Isabel (1857–1868); Plaza de la Libertad (1868–1873); Plaza de la República (1873); Plaza de la República Federal (1873–1875); Plaza de San Fernando (1875–1931) Plaza de la República (1931–1936)
- Type: Public square
- Owner: Ayuntamiento de Sevilla
- Area: 7260 m²
- Postal code: 41001
- Coordinates: 37.3886°N 5.9955°W

Construction
- Construction start: 1852
- Completed: 1856

Plaza Nueva (lit. 'New Square') is a public square in the city center of Seville, Spain, containing the Seville City Hall. The land which the plaza is built on was formerly part of the San Fernando convent from 1270 to 1840. The land was later acquired by the local government and converted into a public square. The plaza was completed in 1856.

== Name ==
The plaza has undergone a series of name changes since the beginning of its construction in 1852:

- 1852: Plaza Nueva
- 1857: Infanta Isabel
- 1868: Plaza de la Libertad
- 1873: Plaza de la República
- 1875: Plaza de San Fernando
- 1931: Plaza Nueva

== History ==
Prior to the 11th century, the area that is now Plaza Nueva was part of the Guadalquivir river. In the 1981, while digging to construct the Seville Metro, remains of a 10th-century ship and a two-meter-long 6th century Byzantine anchor were found under the plaza.

By the 11th century the space was occupied by a cemetery and several orchards.

From 1270 to 1840 the convent Convento Casa Grande de San Francisco occupied the area that is now Plaza Nueva. The convent and its gardens extended beyond the bounds of where the modern-day plaza is located, reaching as far as present day Calle Zaragoza. During the occupation of Seville by Napoleonic troops in the 19th century, the convent suffered great structural damage, including a fire in 1810. In 1840, the government decided to acquire the land and demolish what remained of the convent.

In 1848, María Isabel—the first daughter of the Duke of Montpensier and Infanta María Luisa—was born at the Alcázar of Seville. In her honor, on November 13, 1849, the City Council named the site *Plaza de la Princesa María Isabel* (Princess María Isabel Square), although it was known as *Plaza Nueva* (New Square) even in official documents. The Revolution of 1868 led to the square being renamed *Plaza de la Libertad* (Liberty Square). With the proclamation of the First Spanish Republic in 1873, it became known as *Plaza de la República* (Republic Square). That same year, the name was changed to *Plaza de la República Federal* (Federal Republic Square). In 1875, it was renamed *Plaza de San Fernando* (Saint Ferdinand Square). In 1931, with the advent of the Second Spanish Republic, it was named *Plaza de la República*, and in 1936, it reverted to the name *Plaza de San Fernando*. Nevertheless, local residents have always called it *Plaza Nueva*, as it was created much later than most of the squares in the city center.

The plaza was completed in 1856.

== Monument of Ferdinand III of Castile in Seville ==
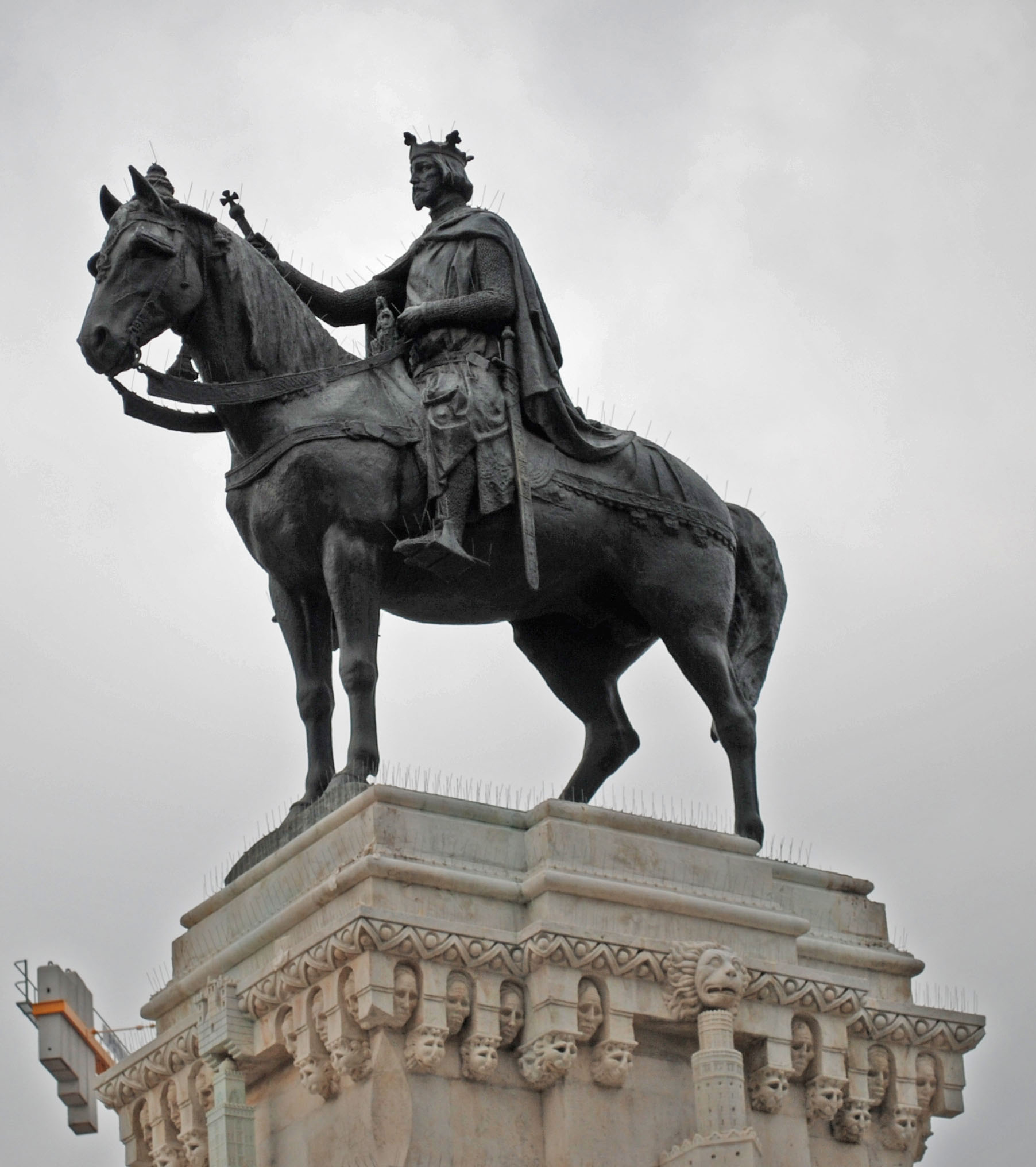
Top of the Monument of Fernando III depicting him on horseback

In the center of the plaza is an equestrian statue of Fernando III who conquered Seville for the Christians in 1248, and later was declared a saint by the Catholic church in 1671.

Since its construction, the designers of the plaza wanted to place a monument in the center of the plaza, thinking first of constructing a monument to Murillo and later thinking of erecting a statue of Isabella II.

It was finally decided on to build a monument to Fernando III in 1920. The monument is the work of Spanish architect Juan Talavera y Heredia and sculptor Joaquín Bilbao, and was inaugurated in August 1924.

== Buildings ==
=== Casa consistorial de Sevilla ===
The city hall of Seville is located in the plaza, in the Casa consistorial de Sevilla building with an 18th-century façade.

=== Edificio de oficinas Philips, Seville ===
This office building was designed by Spanish architect Alfonso Toro Buiza.

=== Telefónica building ===
Seville's Telefónica building was designed in 1926 by Spanish architect Juan Talavera y Heredia. It utilizes Baroque architecture.

=== Capilla de San Onofre ===
The San Ofre Chapel is the only remaining part of the former convent that once occupied the plaza. Since 1520 it has been operated by Hermandad de las Ánimas de San Onofre.

The chapel contains four altarpieces:

- Altarpiece titled Animas and the Virgen de la Candelaria
- Altarpiece by Bernando Simon de Pineda with sculptures by Pedro Roldán
- Altarpiece dedicated to Saint Laureano
- Altarpiece commissioned in the sixteenth century for San Onofre

== See also ==
- Seville City Hall
- Plaza de San Francisco, Seville
