= Pino Montano =

Suburb of Seville

Pino Montano is a suburb of Seville located north of the SE-30 road. The suburb is part of the North District of Seville.

Originally, the area where Pino Montano is now located was primarily agricultural, consisting of olive groves divided into plots and managed through farmhouses. In the latter half of the 19th century, a railway was constructed to connect Seville with Cordoba, creating a boundary that separated land intended for cultivation from areas designated for housing development. Pino Montano itself was established during Spain's era of rapid urban development in the 1960s, a period marked by Seville's chaotic expansion northward. The neighborhood began to take shape in the 1970s, when its first residents settled there, and it has continued to grow steadily ever since.

== Population ==
Population (1 January 2020):

Group	Male	Female	Total
Younger than 18 years old	3040	2958	5998
In between 18 and 64 years old	10 788	11 353	22 141
Older than 64 years old	1826	2298	4124
Total	15 654	16 609	32 263

== Infrastructure ==
=== Educational centres ===
Primary schools:

- CEIP Ignacio Sánchez Mejías
- CEIP Adriano
- CEIP Trajano
- CEIP Teodosio
- CEIP María Zambrano
- CEIP Pablo Ruíz Picasso

Secondary schools:

- IES Julio Verne
- IES Albert Einstein
- IES Pino Montano
- IES Félix Rodríguez de la Fuente

Professional Training:

- MEDAC Pino Montano

=== Health centres ===
- Pino Montano A
- Pino Montano B

=== Fire station ===
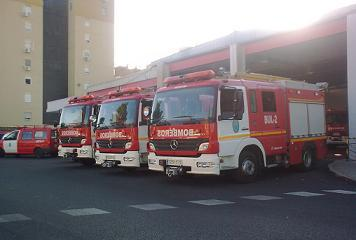
Pino Montano Fire Station

=== Sports centres ===
- Los Mares
- José López Soto (Los Corrales)
- Pino Montano

=== Theatres ===
- Atalaya TNT

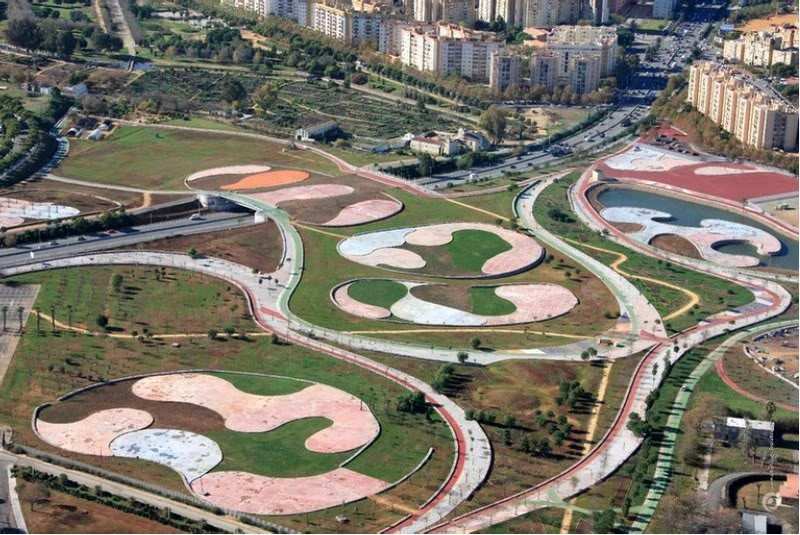
Miraflores Park

=== Libraries ===
- Centro cívico Entreparques
- Asociación de Vecinos de Pino Montano.

== Parks and green areas ==
The two main green areas of Pino Montano are Miraflores park, opened to the public in 2009, and the Ciudad de la Imagen park.

== Celebrations ==
Pino Montano is heavily involved in Seville's renowned Holy Week (Semana Santa). The local brotherhood, known as the Hermandad de Pino Montano, plays a significant role during this period. Established in 1982 and recognized as a brotherhood of penance in 2007, it is officially titled the Brotherhood and Brotherhood of Nazarenes of Our Father Jesus of Nazareth, Holy Mary of Love, St. Mark the Evangelist, and St. Isidore the Laborer. Their processions typically commence from the Parish of San Isidro Labrador, located on Potters Street.

In addition to Holy Week, Pino Montano also celebrates the Velá de San Miguel, a traditional festival held in several Seville neighborhoods. This event features street booths, gastronomy, music, and attractions for children, fostering a lively community atmosphere.

== Geography ==
=== Climate ===
Pino Montano's climate is a very hot-summer Mediterranean climate (Köppen climate classification Csa), featuring very hot, long, dry summers and mild winters with moderate rainfall. Pino Montano has an annual average of 19.6 °C (67 °F). The annual average temperature is 25.7 °C (78 °F) during the day and 13.3 °C (56 °F) at night.

Temperatures above 40 °C (104 °F) are not uncommon in summer. In fact, Seville became the first city in the world to name a heat wave, with a nickname "Zoe". The hottest temperature extreme of 46.6 °C (116 °F) was registered by the weather station at Seville Airport on 23 July 1995 while the coldest temperature extreme of −5.5 °C (22 °F) was also registered by the airport weather station on 12 February 1956. A historical record high (disputed) of 50.0 °C (122 °F) was recorded on 4 August 1881, according to the NOAA Satellite and Information Service. There is an unaccredited record by the National Institute of Meteorology of 47.2 °C (117 °F) on 1 August during the 2003 heat wave, according to a weather station (83910 LEZL) located in the southern part of Seville Airport, near the former US San Pablo Air Force Base. This temperature would be one of the highest ever recorded in Spain, yet it hasn't been officially confirmed.

== Public transport ==
TUSSAM lines in Pino Montano:

Lines	Journey
12	Pino Montano - Ponce de León
13	Pino Montano - Plaza del Duque
03	Pino Montano - Bellavista
LN	Pino Montano - Prado de San Sebastián
C6A	Circular Macarena Norte Sentido A
C6B	Circular Macarena Norte Sentido B

Metro line (projected for 2028)

Lines	Journey
3	Pino Montano - Bellavista
