= Diego de Riaño =

Spanish architect

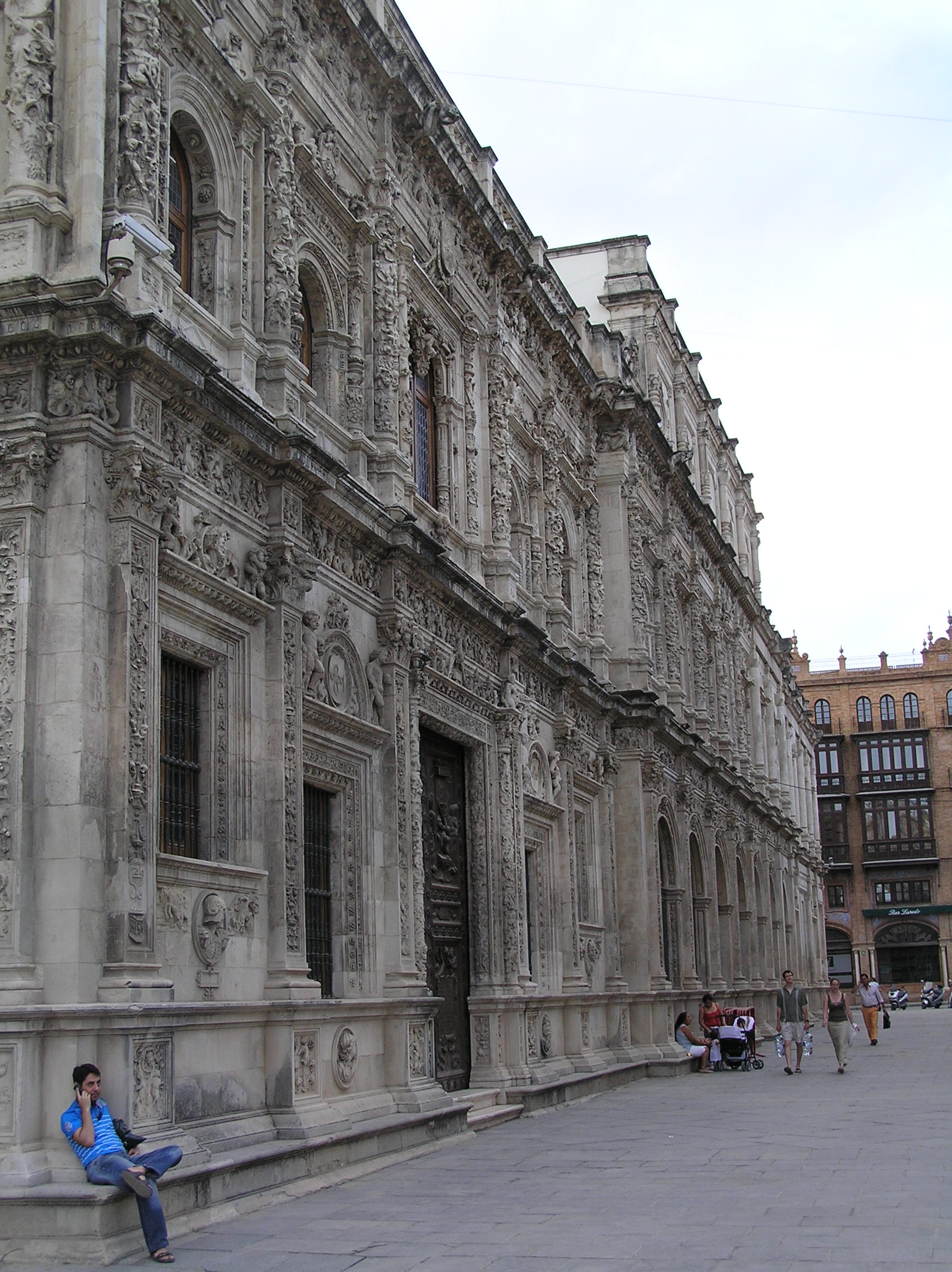
Façade of the Casa consistorial, Seville.

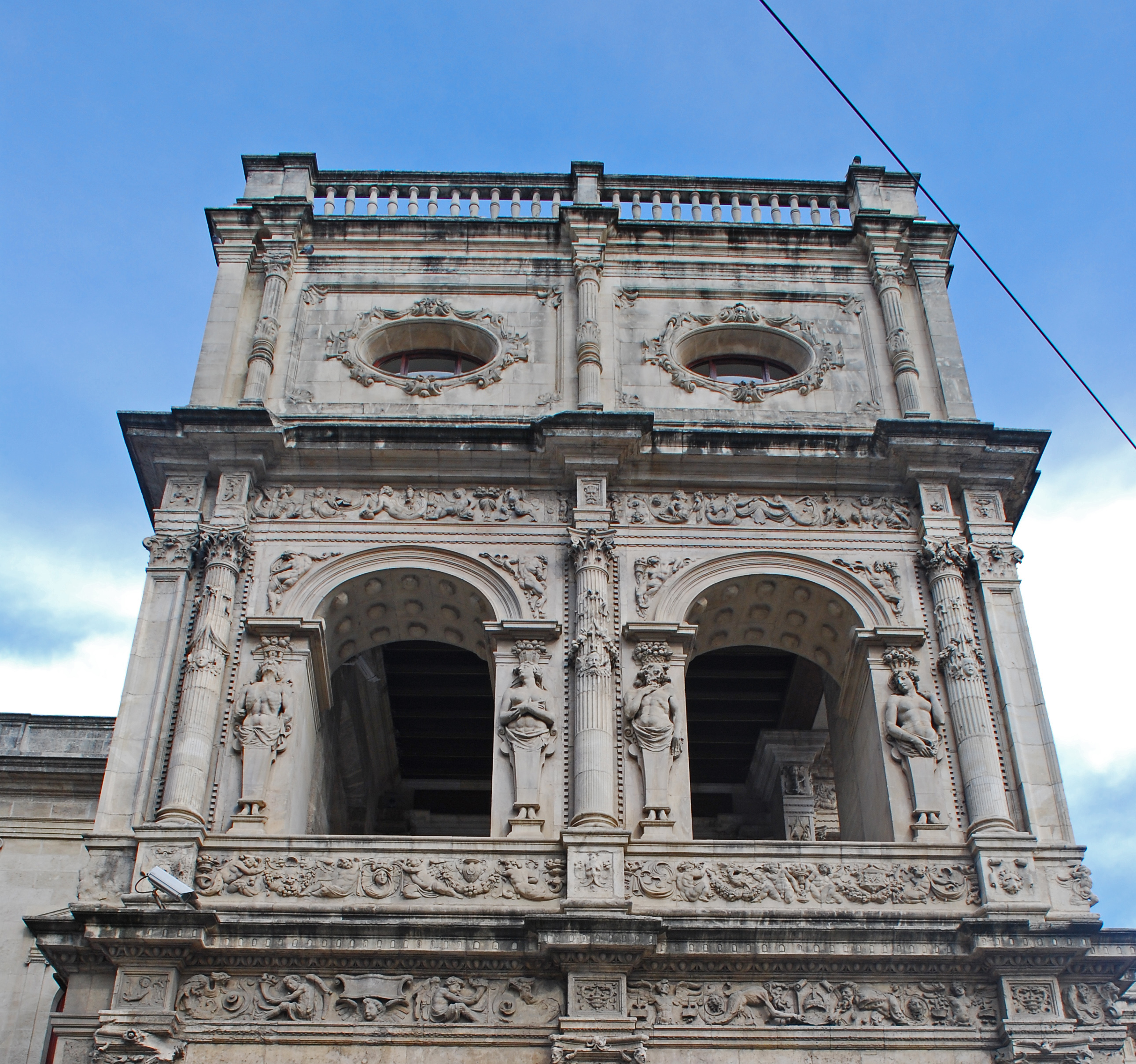
Façade of the Casa consistorial, Seville.

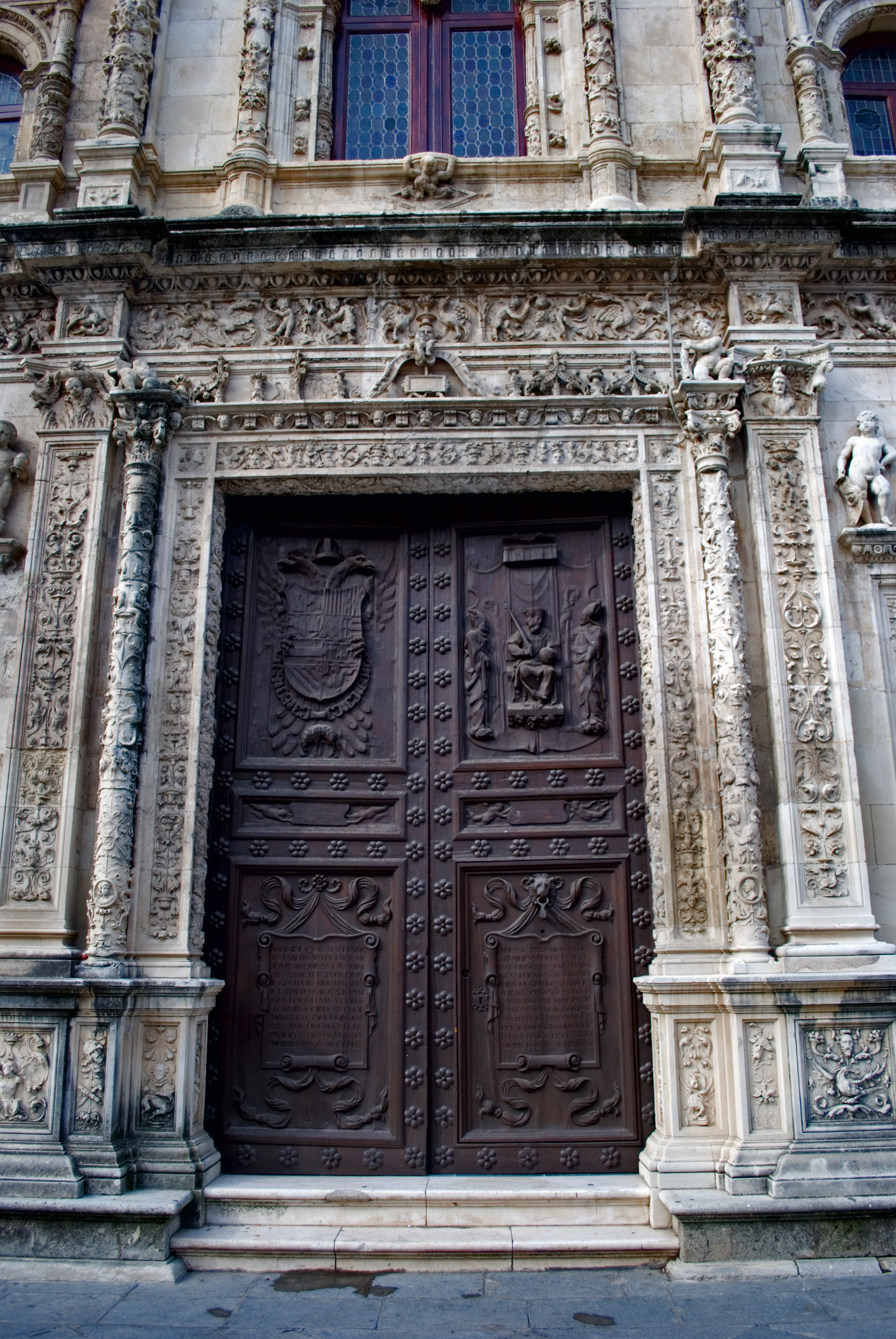
Façade of the Casa consistorial, Seville.

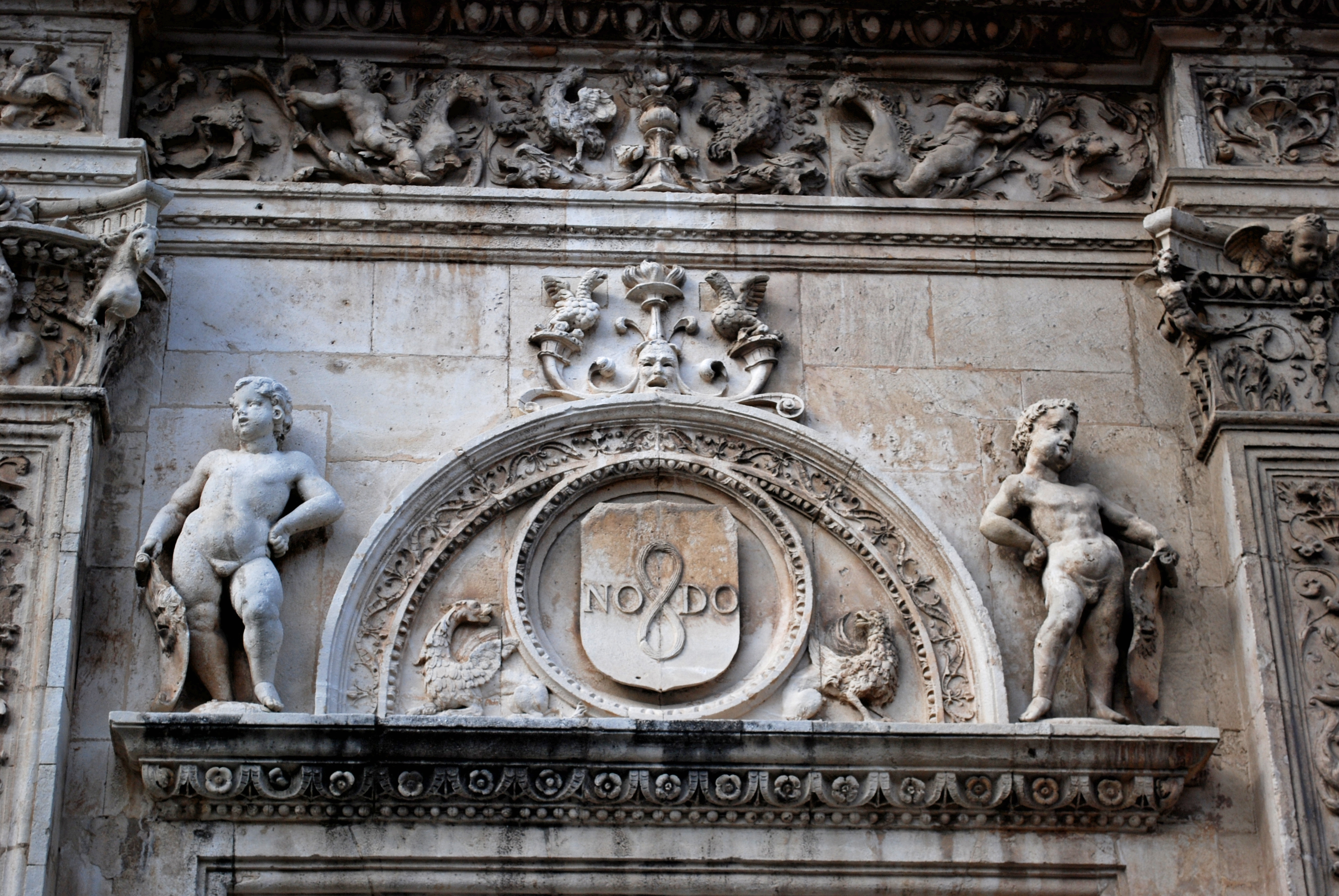
Façade of the Casa consistorial, Seville.

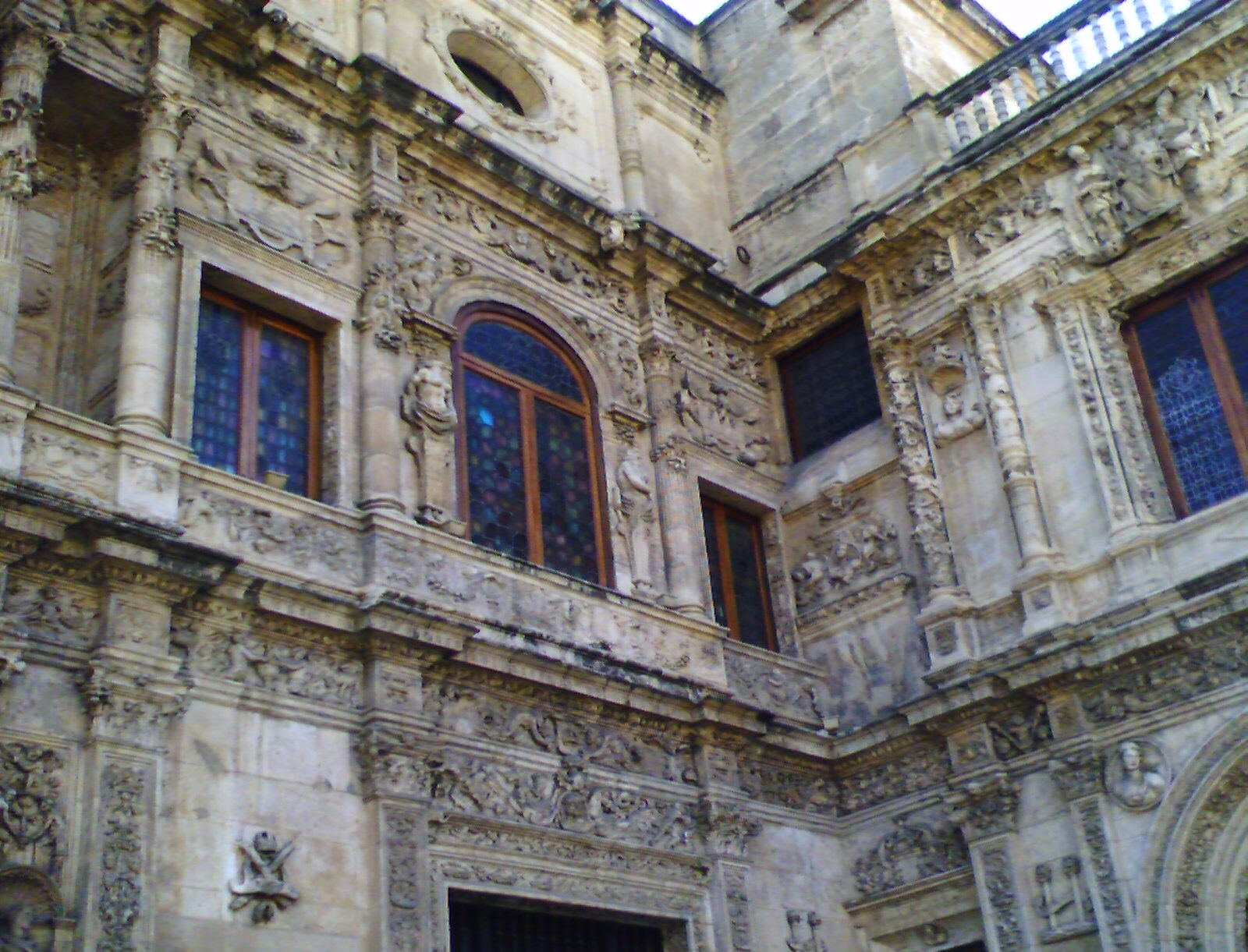
Façade of the Casa consistorial, Seville.

Diego de Riaño (died 1534) was a Spanish architect of the Renaissance. He was one of the most outstanding architects of the Plateresque style.

He was born at Riaño, in Cantabria, and is documented in Seville starting from 1523. In 1527 he commenced the Collegiate of Valladolid and later was director of the works of the Cathedral of Seville, until his death in 1534. He also worked at the University of Osuna.

== Works ==
His works include:

- Casa consistorial, Seville
- Sacristía de los Cálices, also in Seville
- Four chapels at the choir of the Cathedral of Seville
- Plans of the Cathedral of Valladolid (not constructed)
- Works in the refectory of the Jerez Charterhouse, in 1533

== See also ==
- Renaissance architecture

== Sources ==
- Arquitectura renacentista. Historia de la Arquitectura Española, Volume 3. Editorial Planeta. 1986.
