= Bellavista, Seville =

Coordinates: 37°23′N 5°59′W

Bellavista
- Neighbourhood
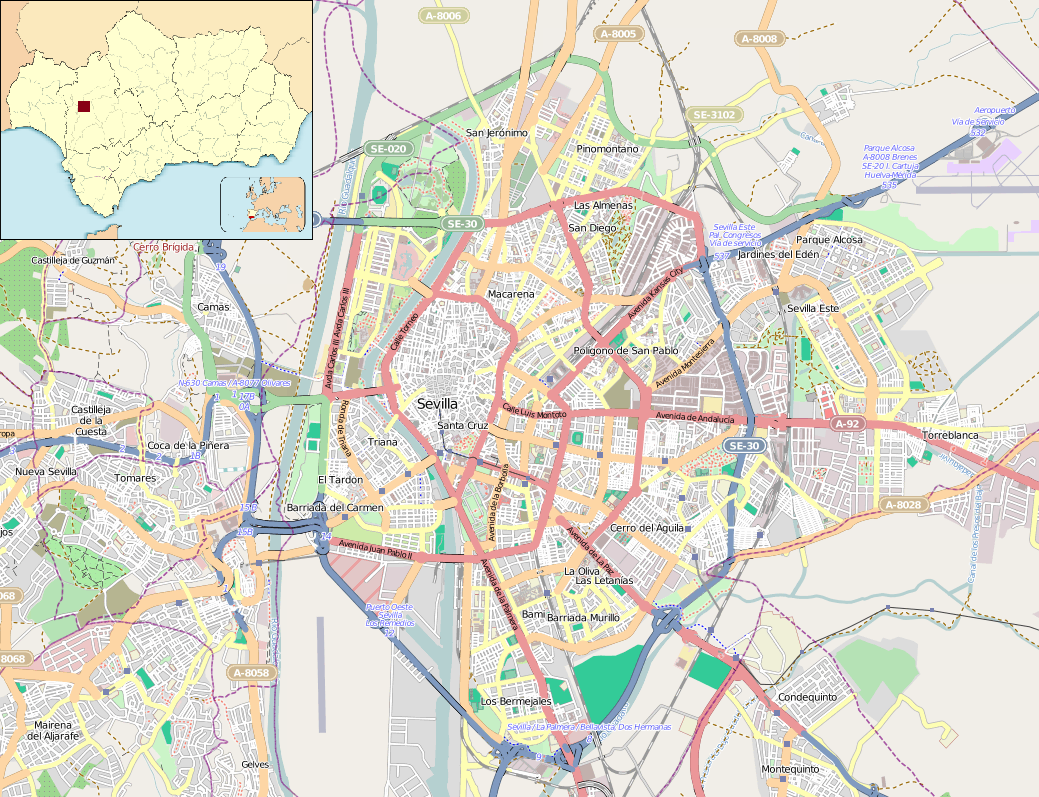
- Location within Seville Bellavista (Spain)
- Country: Spain
- Autonomous community: Andalusia
- Province: Seville
- Municipality: Seville
- District: Bellavista-La Palmera
- Founded: 1925

Population
  - Total: 15,000–20,000
- Time zone: UTC+1 (CET)
- Postal code(s): 41014

Bellavista is a neighbourhood in the Bellavista-La Palmera district in the south of the city of Seville, Andalusia, Spain. It lies on the east bank of the Guadaira river, a tributary of the Guadalquivir. It has between 15,000 and 20,000 inhabitants.

The land Bellavista would be built on was known in the mid-1800s as Venta de la Salud. The land was purchased in 1924, and subdivided into what would become the neighbourhood of Bellavista in 1925. The name "Bellavista" came from an area of the same name in Buenos Aires, Argentina. Bellavista belonged to the city of Dos Hermanas until 1937, when it was incorporated into the city of Seville.

Bellavista is the birthplace of Felipe González, the first socialist Prime Minister after the restoration of democracy in Spain.
