= Seville City Hall =

Building in Seville, Andalusia, Spain

Coordinates: 37.3887°N 5.9945°W

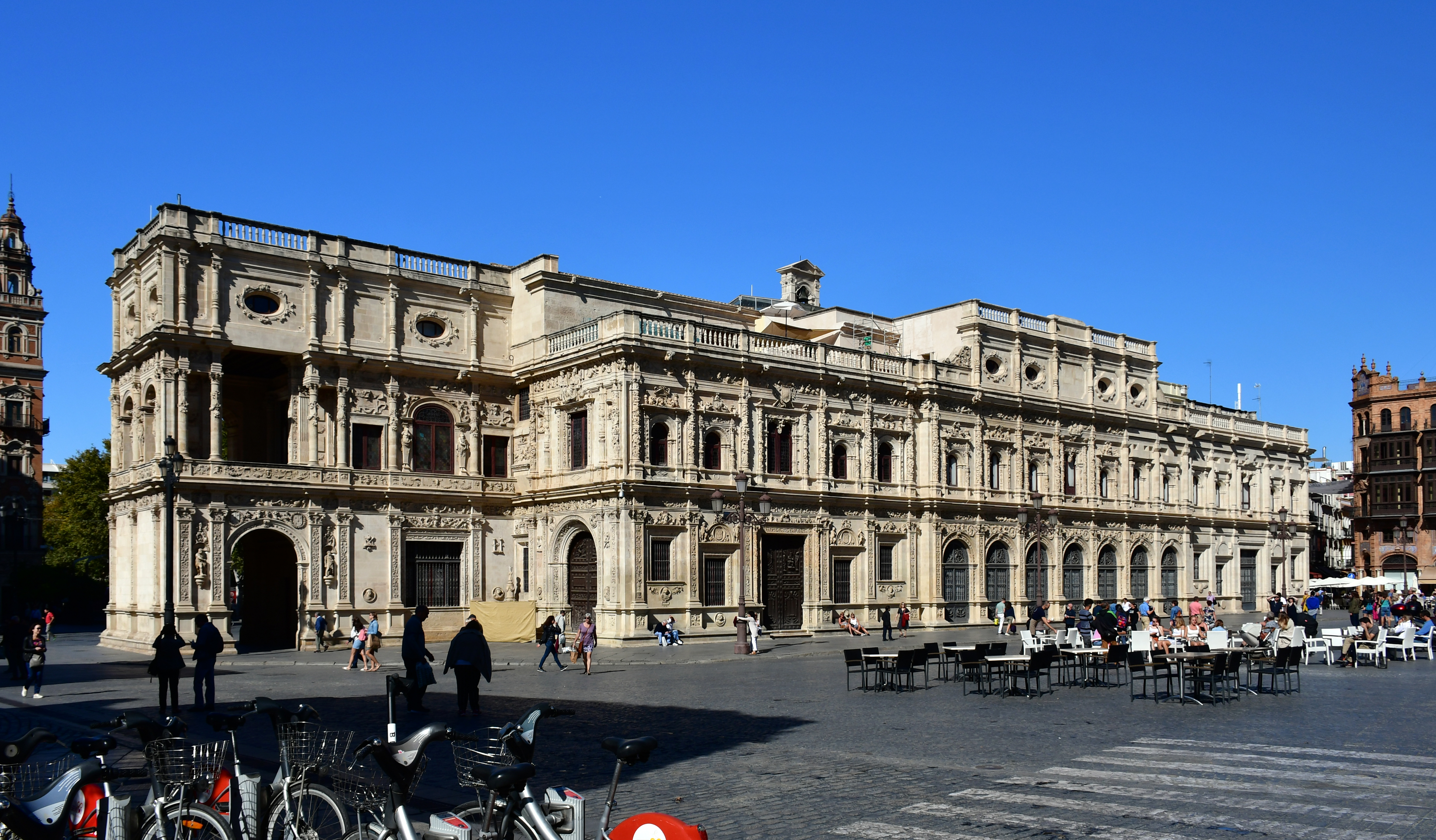
Plateresque façade of the Casa consistorial, Seville City Hall

The Seville City Hall (Spanish: Casa consistorial de Sevilla) is a Plateresque-style building in Plaza Nueva in Seville (Andalusia, Spain), currently housing the City Council of Seville.

The building has a large façade divided into five modules, decorated by Plateresque reliefs; these include grotesque motifs inspired by Italian Florentine architecture, heraldry symbols, allegories of Justice and Good Government and depictions of mythological or historical characters such as Hercules, Julius Caesar and Charles V.

== History ==
In 1526, following the wedding in Seville of the emperor Carlos V, Holy Roman Emperor, with his cousin Isabella of Portugal, the need was felt to build a building for the city hall that would represent the power and importance of the city at the time. Until then the Council or Cabildo of Seville, like almost all of the civil and ecclesiastical ministries of the city, had its seat in houses of the Corral de los Olmos, today occupied by the Plaza de la Virgen de los Reyes, behind the cathedral. The new building was located on the Plaza de San Francisco, a central commercial square, in front of the Convent of San Francisco and the Real Audiencia de los Grados.

Construction of the building began under architect Diego de Riaño, who directed the works between 1527 and his death in 1534. He was commissioned to construct a durable stone building, with a façade facing the Plaza Mayor in front of the convent of San Francisco. He executed what is now the southern section of the City Hall, including the arch that had communicated with the Franciscan monastery and two wings covered with Plateresque reliefs with representations of historical and mythical characters, heraldic symbols and emblems alluding to the founders of the city.

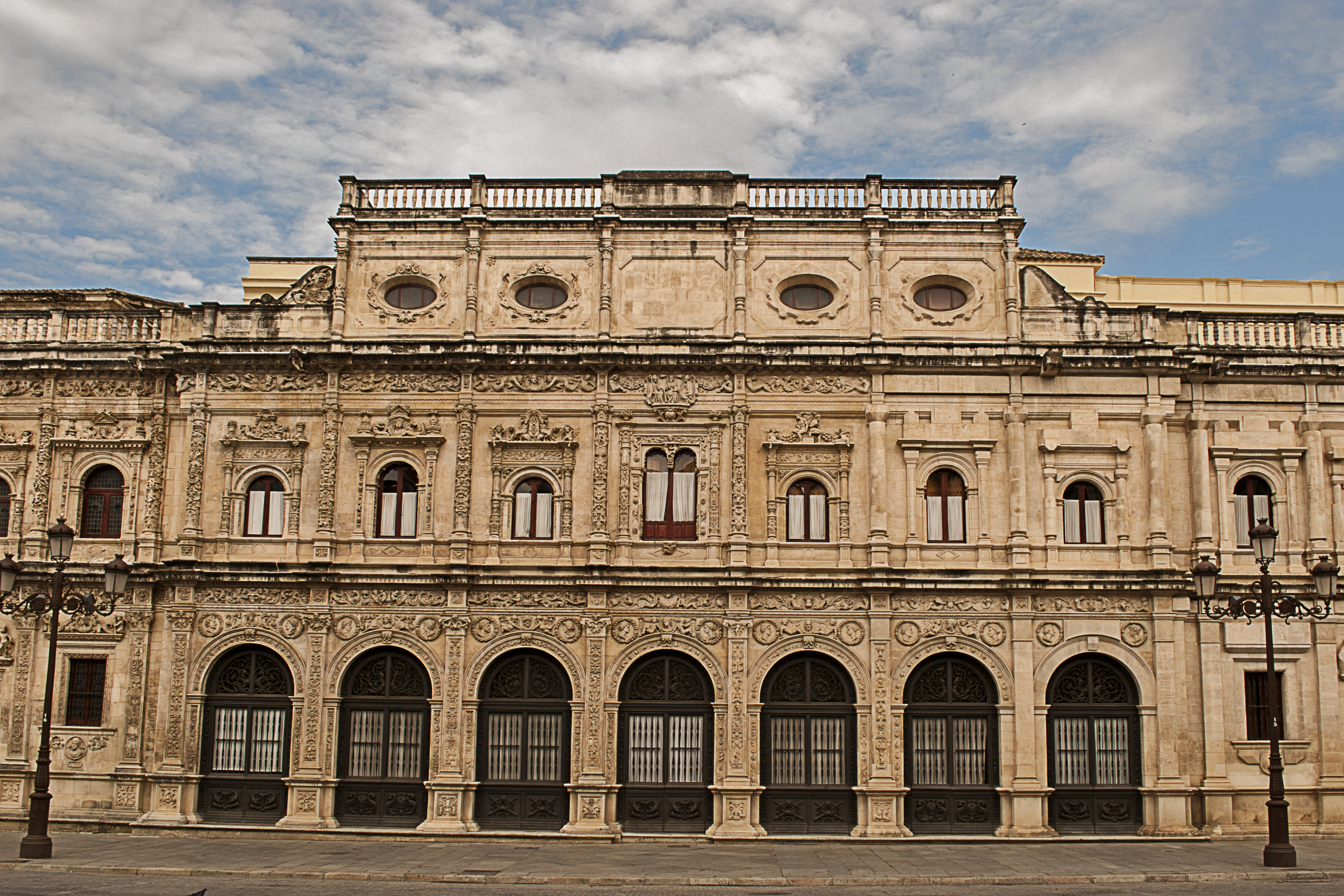
Plateresque façade of the city hall in Seville, on the Plaza de San Francisco. The reliefs in the upper and right sections were never completed.

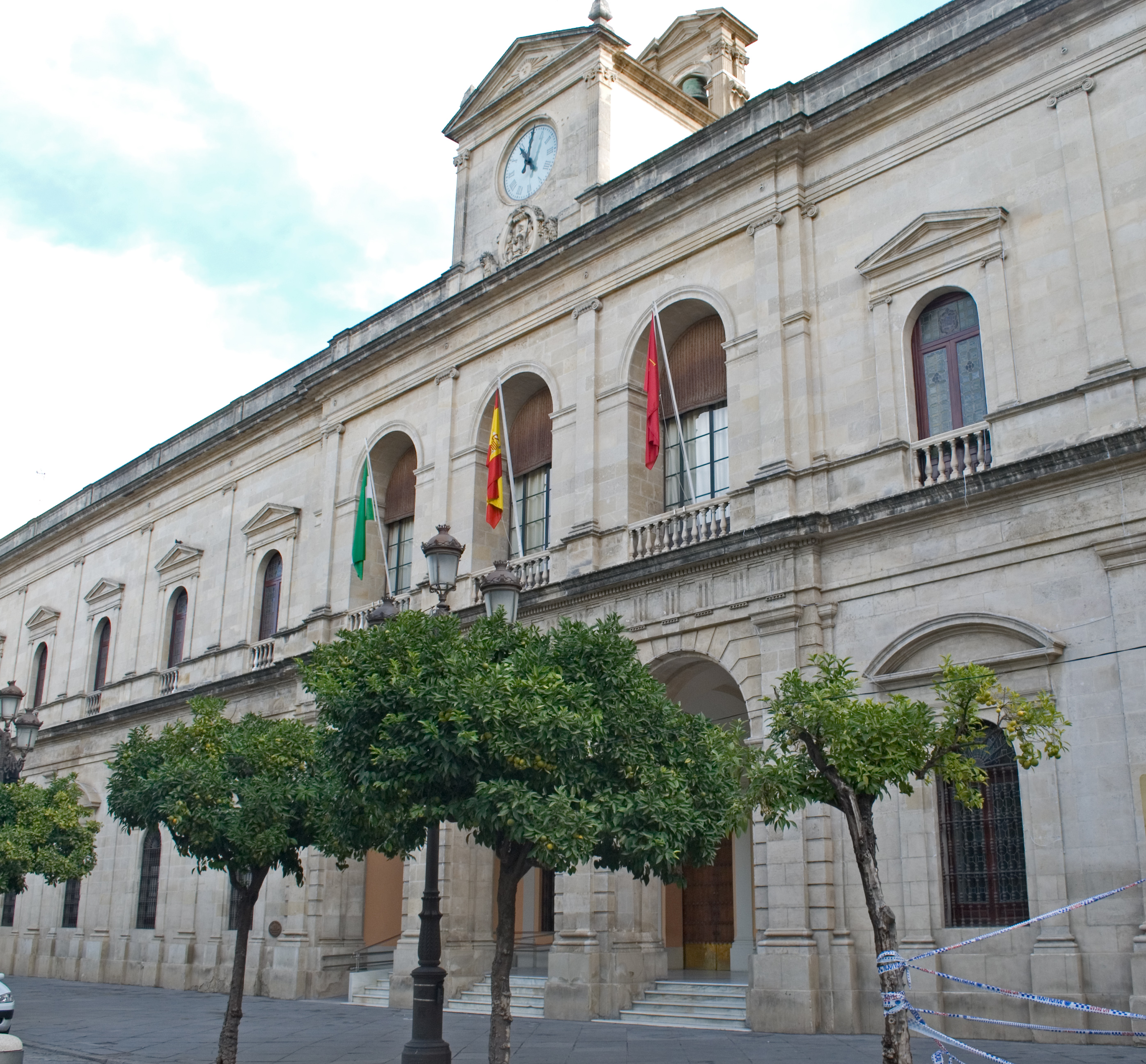
Main façade of the Town Hall of Seville, on the Plaza Nueva, expanded in the Neoclassical style in 19th century

In the 19th century, after the demolition of the convent of San Francisco, an important expansion, executed by Demetrio de los Ríos and Balbino Marrón, created a new, Neoclassical façade oriented to the Plaza Nueva. On the opposite side, facing the Plaza de San Francisco, the north wing of the old building became the south wing of symmetrical tripartite façade as the building was expanded to the north. Plateresque carving was extended partway across the new façade in an attempt to match the style of the old building, but it was never completed. Given its status as a Bien de Interés Cultural, it is unlikely to ever be finished due to the restrictions placed on the remodelling of such buildings. The architects also reorganized the interior around two courtyards and a grand staircase.

== Building ==
=== Exterior ===
==== Façade to the Plaza de San Francisco ====
The façade is developed with marked horizontality articulated by a precise architectural composition, distributed in five modules. The structure has two floors, surmounted in places by a third, covered with Plateresque reliefs. These vibrant sculptural carvings include Florentine grotesques; heraldic shields; emblems alluding to justice, harmony and good government; and representations of characters linked to the city, such as Hercules, Julius Caesar (who created the first Cabildo), and the Emperor Charles V (who made Seville one of the capitals of his empire). The carving was carried out by artists from many different places, including Juan de Begines, Diego Guillén Ferrant, Hernando de la Teja, Pedro de Pamanes, Pedro de Guadalupe and Toribio de Liébana.

The arcade that at the time gave way to the convent of San Francisco, and that currently communicates with the Plaza Nueva, was built under the direction of Juan Sánchez, the successor to Diego de Riaño, who supervised the work between 1535 and 1540.

==== Main façade to Plaza Nueva ====
The main façade facing Plaza Nueva was completed in 1867, executed by Demetrio de los Ríos and Balbino Marrón.

=== Interior ===
==== Ground floor ====
On the ground floor are located the following:

- Apeadero (access to the building), a rectangular room parallel to the façade on the Plaza de San Francisco, with hybrid elements between the Gothic and the Plateresque Renaissance.
- Antecabildo, with the staircase, which is divided into two sections, one with an almost flat vault and the other covered by a dome, both executed by Juan Sánchez.
- Cabildo bajo or lower chapter house, with a magnificent vault with coffers in which are sculpted images of kings. The hall is covered by a double row of benches; the walls have a frieze with medallions and grotesques.
- Chamber of the Court, next to the arch; it does not communicate with the aforementioned sections.
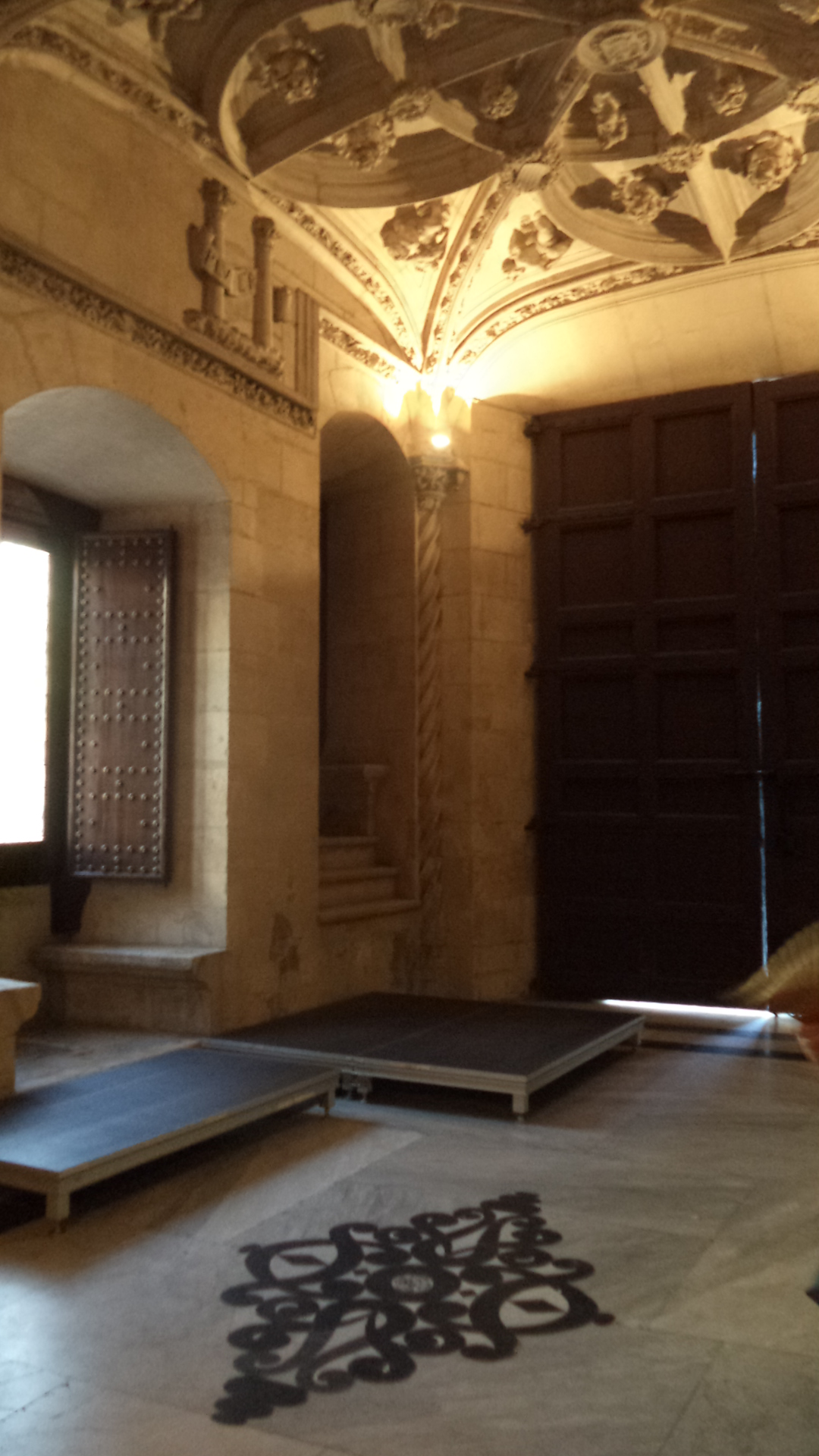
Apeadero, formerly where those who entered dismounted their horses

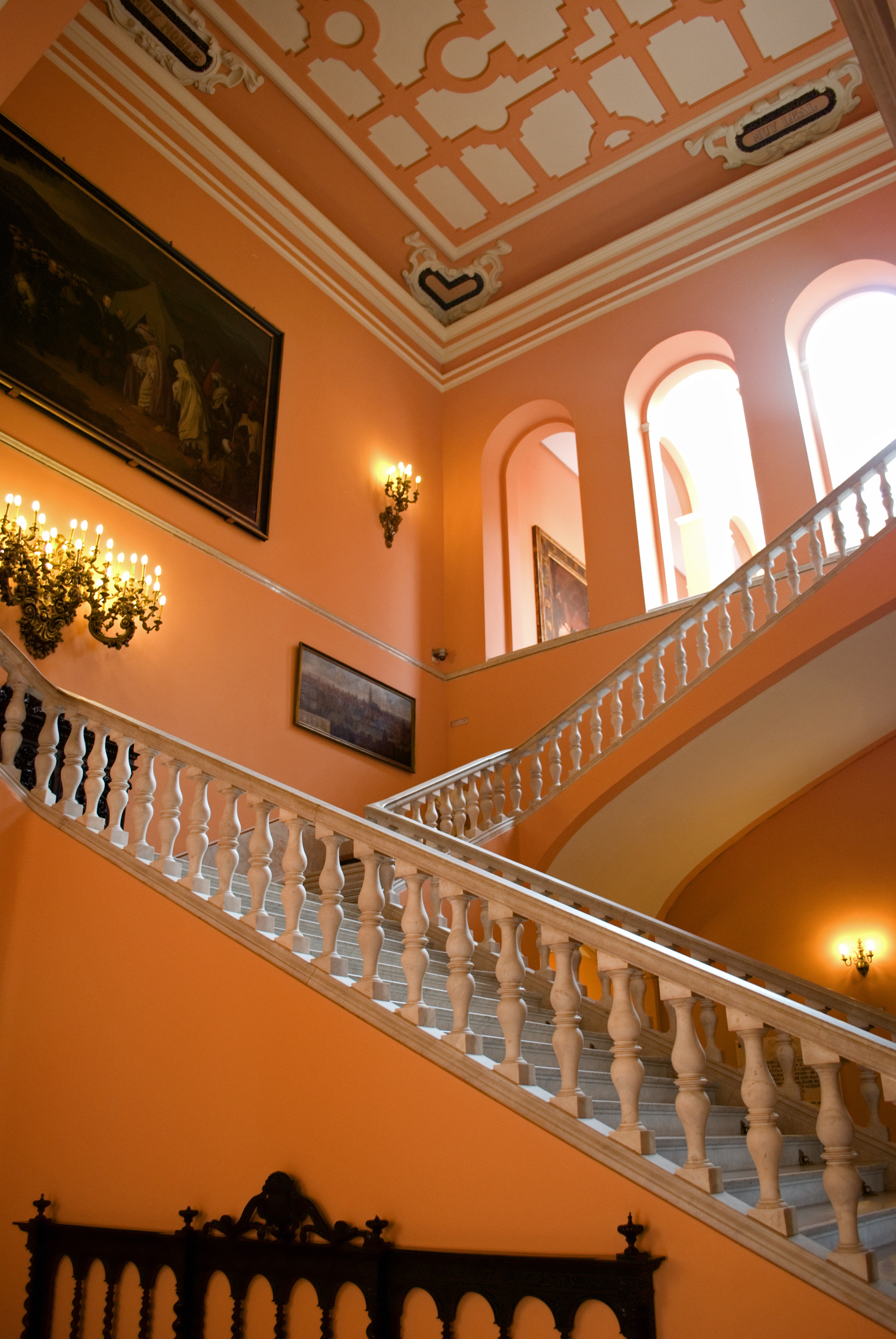
Main staircase

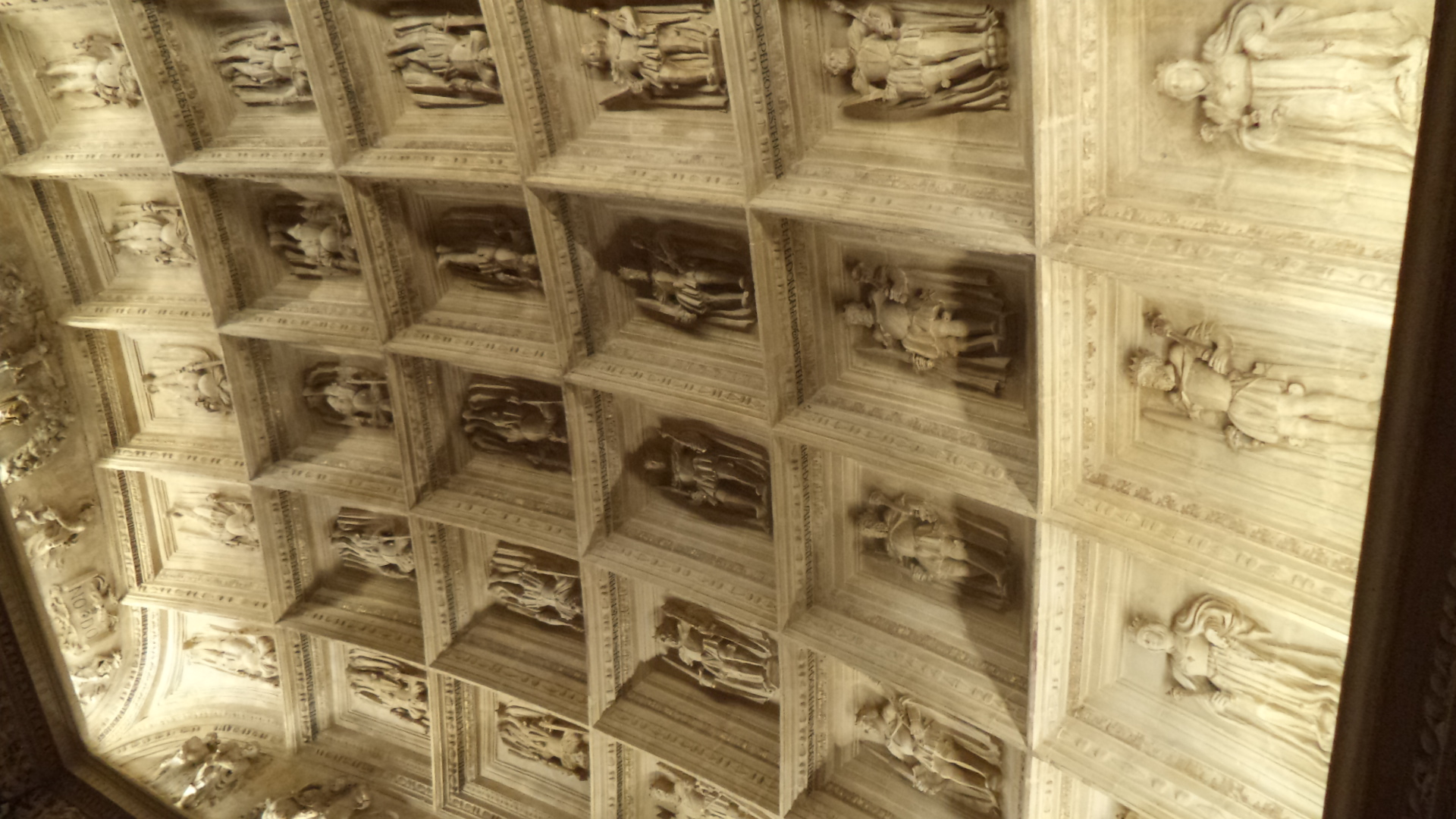
Roof of the lower chapter house, which shows the monarchs of the Hispanic kingdoms up to Carlos V

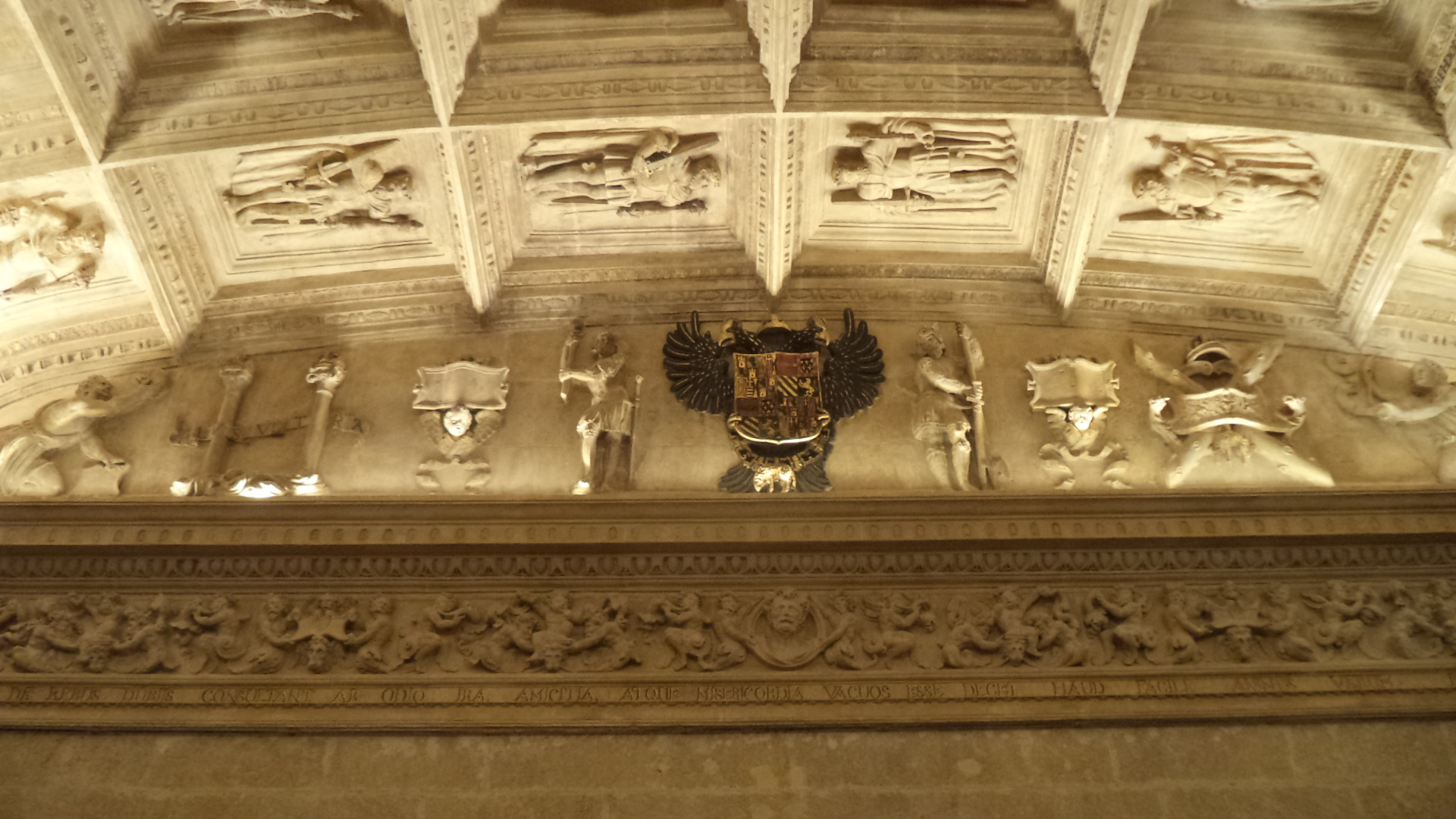
Reliefs in the lower chapter house. Shield of Carlos V flanked by Hercules and Julius Caesar. On one side is the cross of Burgundy and on the other the columns of Hercules.

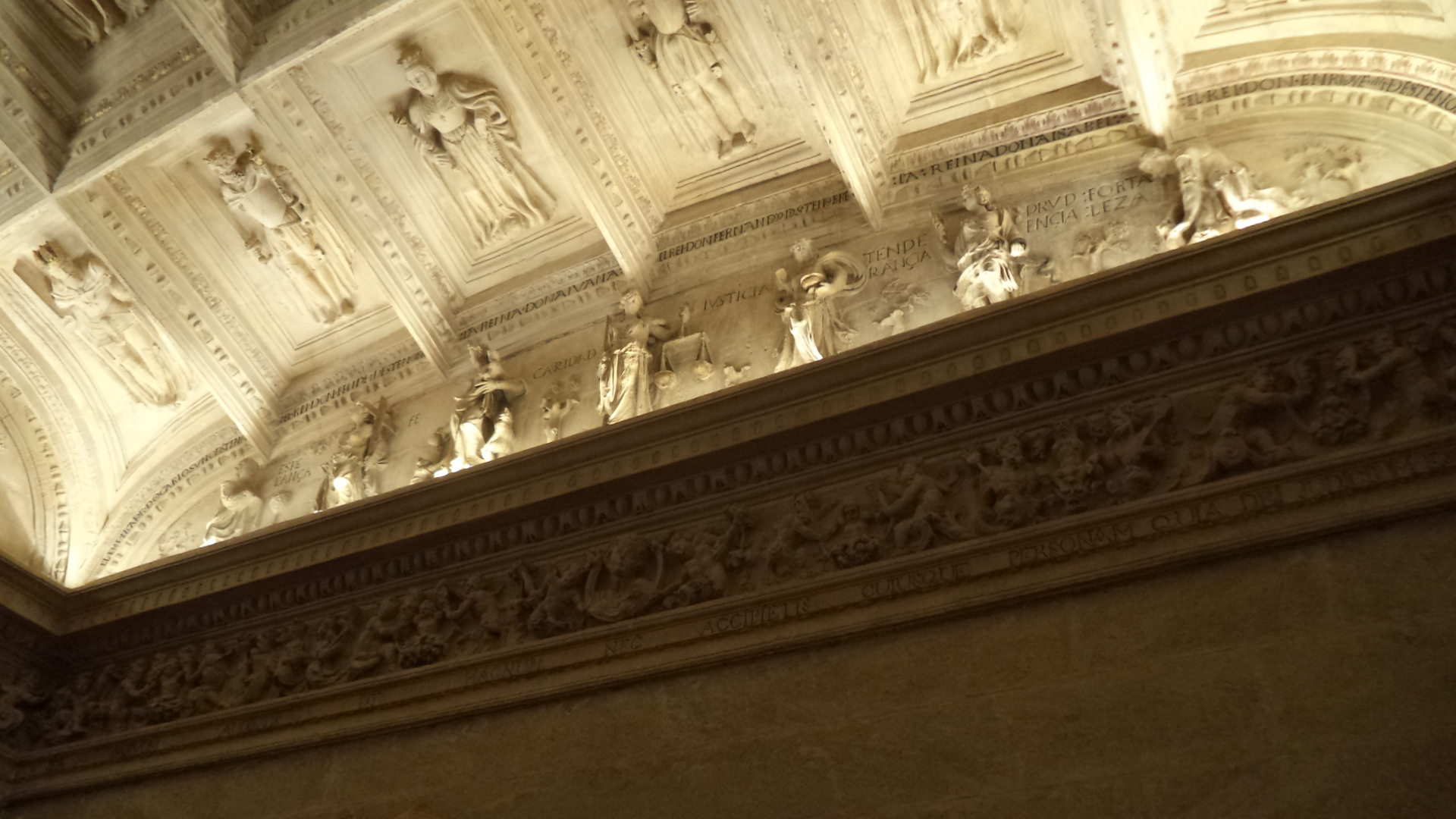
Reliefs in the lower chapter house of the Seville City Hall, where the virtues that should govern the public are represented. Justice is in the center.

=== First floor ===
The staircase leads to the lobby on the top floor, where the following are located:

- Library, from which one can access the upper chapter house.
- Upper chapter house, covered in a coffered wood alfarje. Some of the most important municipal paintings are on display here, such as the Immaculate Conception and the Portrait of Friar Pedro de Oña by Francisco de Zurbarán and The Procession of Santa Clara and The Defeat of the Saracens by Juan de Valdés Leal.
- Columbus Hall, also known as the Bourbon hall, where a series of royal portraits can be found. Here the municipal plenaries have been celebrated since 2008.
- Gala dining room, with a gallery of portraits of characters related to the city.
- Archive.
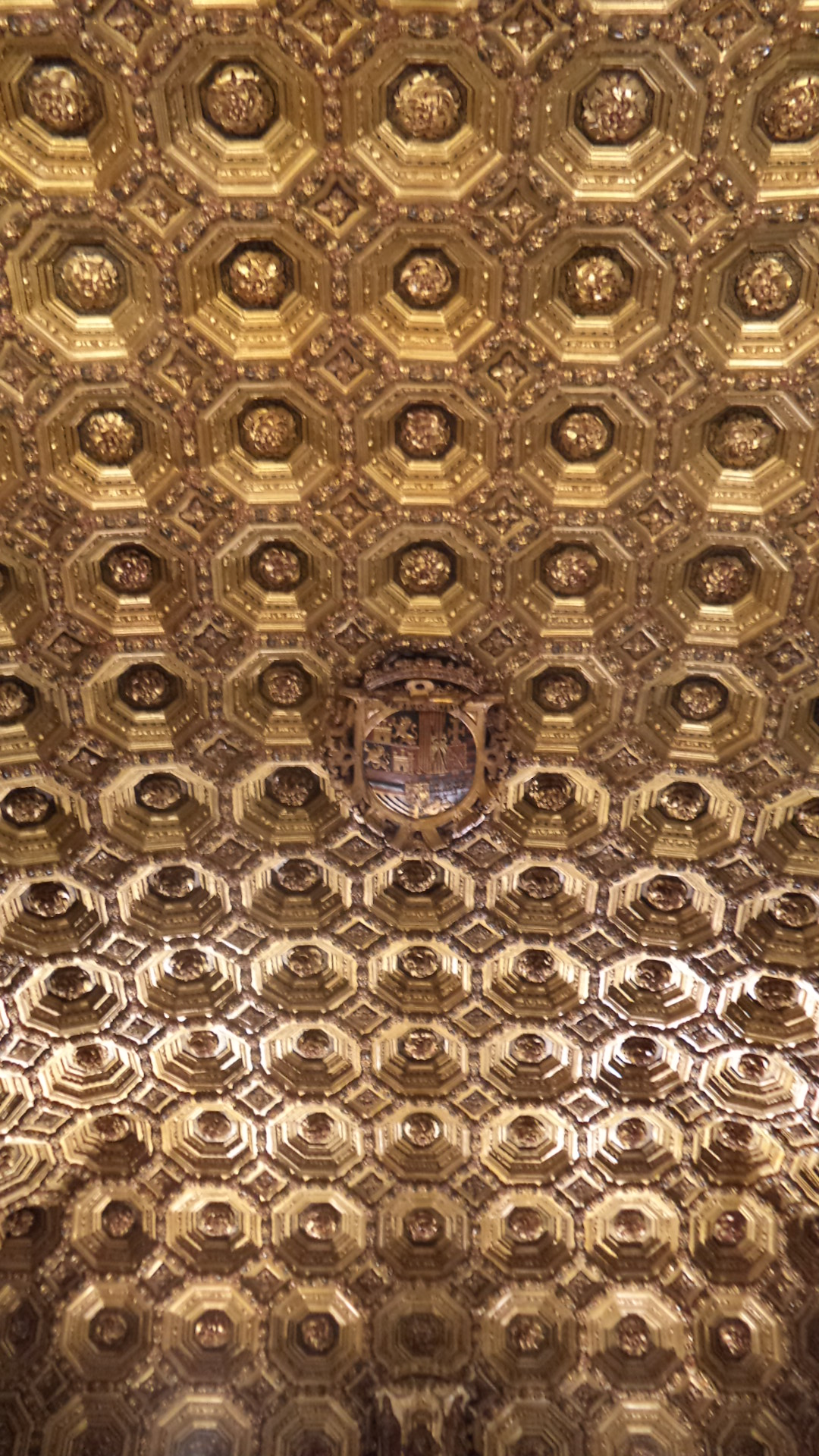
Roof of Upper chapter house

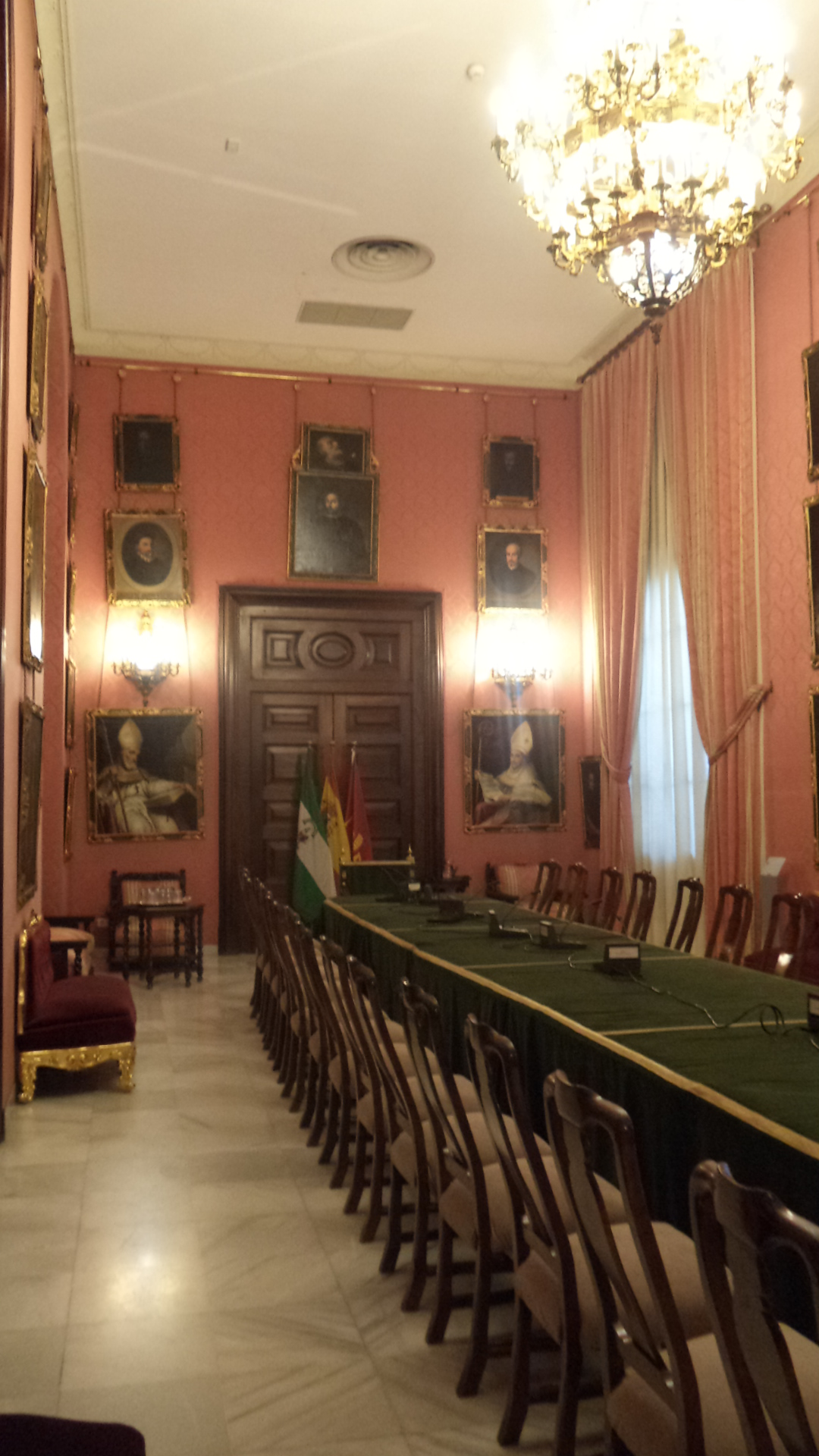
Former gala dining room

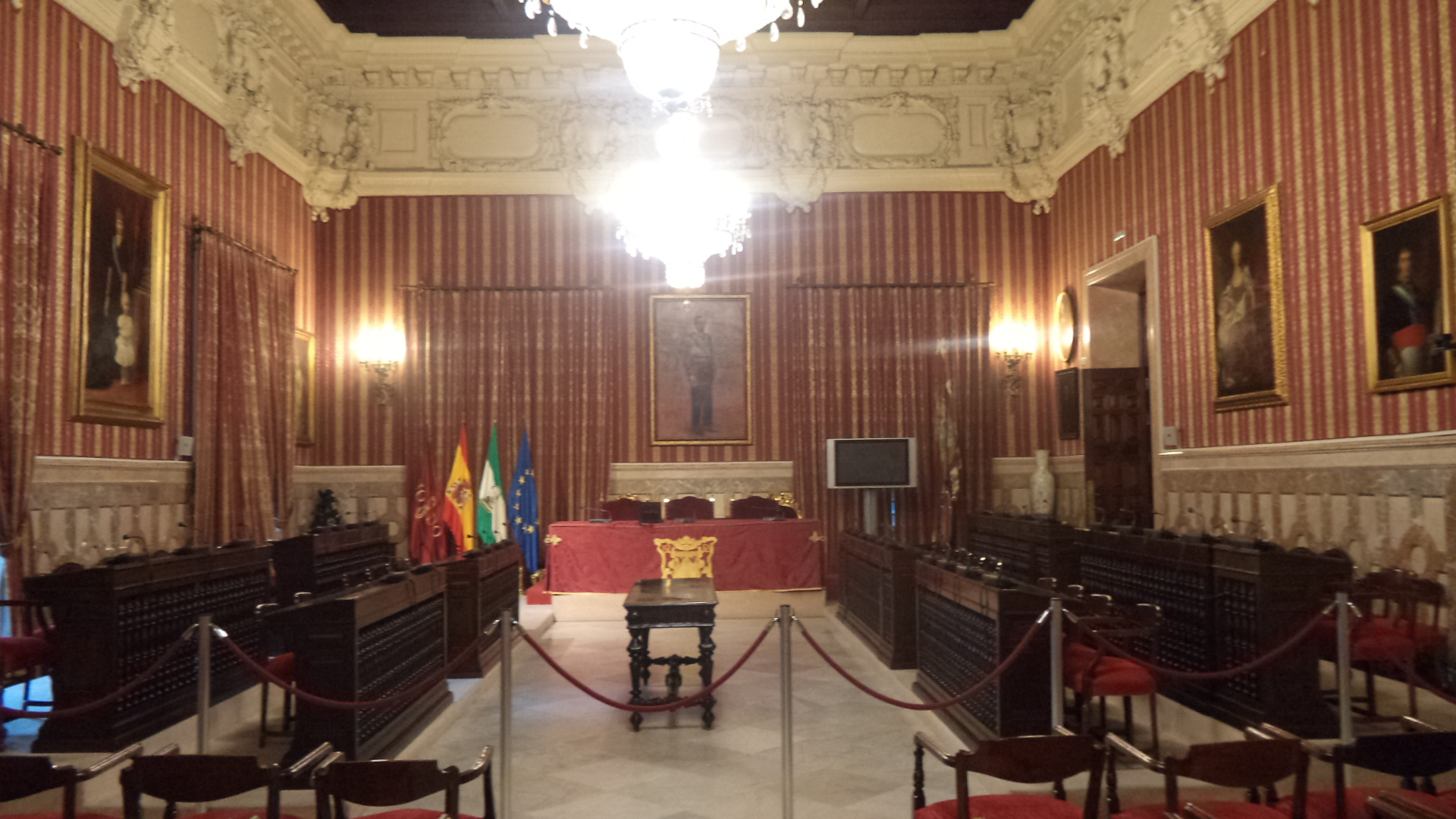
Columbus hall
